North American moths represent about 12,000 types of moths. In comparison, there are about 825 species of North American butterflies. The moths (mostly nocturnal) and butterflies (mostly diurnal) together make up the taxonomic order Lepidoptera.

This list is sorted by MONA number (MONA is short for Moths of America North of Mexico). A numbering system for North American moths introduced by Ronald W. Hodges et al. in 1983 in the publication Check List of the Lepidoptera of America North of Mexico. The list has since been updated, but the placement in families is outdated for some species.

This list covers America north of Mexico (effectively the continental United States and Canada). For a list of moths and butterflies recorded from the state of Hawaii, see List of Lepidoptera of Hawaii.

This is a partial list, covering moths with MONA numbers ranging from 8322 to 11233. For the rest of the list, see List of moths of North America.

Noctuidae
8322 – Idia americalis, American idia moth
8323 – Idia aemula, common idia moth
8323.1 – Idia concisa
8324 – Idia majoralis, greater idia moth
8325 – Idia suffusalis
8326 – Idia rotundalis, rotund idia moth
8327 – Idia forbesii
8328 – Idia julia
8329 – Idia diminuendis, orange-spotted idia moth
8330 – Idia scobialis, smoky idia moth
8331 – Idia laurentii
8332 – Idia terrebralis
8333 – Idia denticulalis, toothed idia moth
8334 – Idia lubricalis, glossy black idia moth
8334.1 – Idia occidentalis
8335 – Idia parvulalis
8336 – Idia gopheri
8337 – Idia immaculalis
8338 – Phalaenophana pyramusalis, dark-banded owlet moth
8339 – Phalaenophana extremalis
8339.1 – Simplicia cornicalis
8340 – Zanclognatha lituralis, lettered zanclognatha moth
8341 – Zanclognatha theralis
8343 – Zanclognatha minoralis
8345 – Zanclognatha laevigata, variable zanclognatha moth
8346 – Zanclognatha atrilineella
8347 – Zanclognatha obscuripennis, dark zanclognatha moth
8348 – Zanclognatha pedipilalis, grayish zanclognatha moth
8349 – Zanclognatha protumnusalis
8350 – Zanclognatha martha
8351 – Zanclognatha cruralis, early zanclognatha moth
8352 – Zanclognatha marcidilinea, yellowish zanclognatha moth
8353 – Zanclognatha jacchusalis, wavy-lined zanclognatha moth
8354 – Zanclognatha lutalba
8355 – Chytolita morbidalis, morbid owlet moth
8356 – Chytolita petrealis, stone-winged owlet moth
8357 – Macrochilo absorptalis, slant-lined owlet moth
8357.1 – Macrochilo hypocritalis, twin-dotted macrochilo moth
8358 – Macrochilo litophora, brown-lined owlet moth
8359 – Macrochilo bivittata, two-striped owlet moth
8359.1 – Macrochilo santerivalis
8360 – Macrochilo orciferalis, bronzy macrochilo moth
8361 – Macrochilo louisiana, Louisiana macrochilo moth
8362 – Phalaenostola metonalis, pale phalaenostola moth
8363 – Phalaenostola eumelusalis, dark phalaenostola moth
8364 – Phalaenostola larentioides, black-banded owlet moth
8365 – Phalaenostola hanhami, Hanham's owlet moth
8366 – Tetanolita mynesalis, smoky tetanolita moth
8367 – Tetanolita palligera
8368 – Tetanolita floridana, Florida tetanolita moth
8369 – Tetanolita negalis
8370 – Bleptina caradrinalis, bent-winged owlet moth
8370.1 – Bleptina araealis
8371 – Bleptina inferior
8372 – Bleptina sangamonia
8373 – Bleptina flaviguttalis
8374 – Bleptina minimalis
8375 – Bleptina hydrillalis
8376 – Hypenula cacuminalis, long-horned owlet moth
8377 – Hypenula caminalis
8378 – Renia salusalis
8379 – Renia factiosalis, sociable renia moth
8380 – Renia nemoralis, chocolate renia moth
8381 – Renia discoloralis, discolored renia moth
8382 – Renia pulverosalis
8383 – Renia hutsoni
8384 – Renia rigida
8384.1 – Renia flavipunctalis, yellow-spotted renia moth
8385 – Renia fraternalis, fraternal renia moth
8386 – Renia adspergillus, speckled renia moth
8387 – Renia sobrialis, sober renia moth
8388 – Renia subterminalis
8389 – Renia mortualis
8390 – Aristaria theroalis
8390.1 – Aglaonice otignatha
8390.2 – Physula albipunctilla
8391 – Carteris oculatalis, dotted carteris moth
8391.1 – Carteris lineata
8392 – Phlyctaina irrigualis
8393 – Lascoria ambigualis, ambiguous moth
8394 – Lascoria aon
8395 – Lascoria alucitalis
8396 – Lascoria orneodalis
8397 – Palthis angulalis, dark-spotted palthis moth
8398 – Palthis asopialis, faint-spotted palthis moth
8399 – Rejectaria albisinuata
8400 – Redectis pygmaea, pygmy redectis moth
8401 – Redectis vitrea, white-spotted redectis moth
8402 – Macristis bilinealis
8402.1 – Macristis geminipunctalis
8403 – Macristis schausi
8404 – Rivula propinqualis, spotted grass moth
8404.1 – Rivula pusilla
8404.2 – Rivula stepheni
8405 – Oxycilla tripla
8406 – Oxycilla basipallida
8407 – Oxycilla malaca, bent-lined tan moth
8408 – Oxycilla mitographa
8409 – Oxycilla ondo
8410 – Zelicodes linearis
8411 – Colobochyla interpuncta, yellow-lined owlet moth
8412 – Melanomma auricinctaria, gold-lined melanomma moth
8413 – Mycterophora inexplicata
8414 – Mycterophora monticola
8415 – Mycterophora longipalpata, long-palped mycterophora moth
8416 – Mycterophora geometriformis
8417 – Mycterophora rubricans
8418 – Parascotia fuliginaria, waved black moth
8419 – Prosoparia perfuscaria
8419.1 – Prosoparia anormalis
8419.2 – Prosoparia floridana
8420 – Hypenodes caducus, large hypenodes moth
8421 – Hypenodes fractilinea, broken-line hypenodes moth
8422 – Hypenodes palustris
8423 – Hypenodes sombrus
8424 – Hypenodes franclemonti
8425 – Dasyblemma straminea
8426 – Dyspyralis illocata, visitation moth
8427 – Dyspyralis puncticosta, spot-edged dyspyralis moth
8428 – Dyspyralis nigellus
8429 – Dyspyralis noloides
8430 – Parahypenodes quadralis, masked parahypenodes moth
8431 – Schrankia macula, black-spotted schrankia moth
8432 – Sigela brauneata
8433 – Sigela penumbrata
8434 – Sigela basipunctaria
8435 – Sigela eoides
8436 – Abablemma grandimacula
8437 – Abablemma brimleyana
8438 – Abablemma bilineata
8438.1 – Abablemma duomaculata
8439 – Phobolosia anfracta
8440 – Nigetia formosalis, thin-winged owlet moth
8441 – Hypena manalis, flowing-line bomolocha moth
8442 – Hypena baltimoralis, Baltimore bomolocha moth
8442.1 – Hypena ramstadtii
8443 – Hypena bijugalis, dimorphic bomolocha moth
8444 – Hypena palparia, mottled bomolocha moth
8445 – Hypena abalienalis, white-lined bomolocha moth
8446 – Hypena deceptalis, deceptive bomolocha moth
8447 – Hypena madefactalis, gray-edged bomolocha moth
8447.1 – Hypena appalachiensis
8448 – Hypena sordidula, sordid bomolocha moth
8448.1 – Hypena subidalis
8449 – Hypena heuloa
8450 – Hypena atomaria
8451 – Hypena vega
8452 – Hypena edictalis, large bomolocha moth
8453 – Hypena umbralis
8454 – Hypena variabilis
8454.1 – Hypena vetustalis
8455 – Hypena eductalis
8456 – Hypena abjuralis
8457 – Hypena minualis, sooty bomolocha moth
8458 – Hypena annulalis
8459 – Hypena degasalis
8460 – Hypena porrectalis
8461 – Hypena humuli, hop vine moth
8462 – Hypena californica
8463 – Hypena decorata
8464 – Hypena modestoides
8465 – Hypena scabra, green cloverworm moth
8466 – Tathorhynchus exsiccata
8467 – Hemeroplanis scopulepes, variable tropic moth
8468 – Hemeroplanis punitalis
8469 – Hemeroplanis secundalis
8470 – Hemeroplanis reversalis
8471 – Hemeroplanis habitalis, black-dotted hemeroplanis moth
8472 – Hemeroplanis historialis
8473 – Hemeroplanis finitima
8474 – Hemeroplanis incusalis
8475 – Hemeroplanis parallela
8475.1 – Hemeroplanis rectalis
8476 – Hemeroplanis immaculalis
8477 – Hemeroplanis obliqualis
8477.1 – Hemeroplanis trilineosa
8477.2 – Mursa phtisialis
8478 – Glympis concors
8479 – Spargaloma sexpunctata, six-spotted gray moth
8480 – Phytometra ernestinana, Ernestine's moth
8481 – Phytometra rhodarialis, pink-bordered yellow moth
8482 – Phytometra apicata
8483 – Phytometra obliqualis
8484 – Phytometra orgiae
8485 – Nychioptera noctuidalis
8486 – Nychioptera accola
8487 – Nychioptera opada
8488 – Hormoschista latipalpis, double-lined brown moth
8489 – Ommatochila mundula
8490 – Pangrapta decoralis, decorated owlet moth
8491 – Ledaea perditalis, lost owlet moth
8492 – Isogona natatrix
8493 – Isogona tenuis, thin-lined owlet moth
8494 – Isogona texana
8495 – Isogona punctipennis
8496 – Isogona segura
8497 – Isogona snowi, Snow's owlet moth
8498 – Isogona scindens
8499 – Metalectra discalis, common fungus moth
8500 – Metalectra quadrisignata, four-spotted fungus moth
8501 – Metalectra bigallis
8502 – Metalectra tantillus, black fungus moth
8503 – Metalectra diabolica, diabolical fungus moth
8504 – Metalectra albilinea
8505 – Metalectra richardsi, Richards' fungus moth
8506 – Metalectra miserulata
8507 – Metalectra edilis
8507.1 – Metalectra geminicincta
8508 – Metalectra cinctus
8509 – Arugisa lutea, common arugisa moth
8510 – Arugisa latiorella, Watson's arugisa moth
8511 – Arugisa punctalis
8512 – Pseudorgyia versuta
8513 – Pseudorgyia russula
8514 – Scolecocampa liburna, deadwood borer moth
8515 – Scolecocampa atriluna
8515.5 – Rhosologia porrecta
8516 – Pharga pallens
8517 – Palpidia pallidior
8518 – Gabara obscura
8519 – Gabara gigantea
8520 – Gabara stygialis
8521 – Gabara infumata
8522 – Gabara subnivosella
8523 – Gabara distema
8524 – Gabara pulverosalis
8525 – Phyprosopus callitrichoides, curve-lined owlet moth
8526 – Phyprosopus calligrapha
8527 – Hypsoropha monilis, large necklace moth
8528 – Hypsoropha hormos, small necklace moth
8528.1 – Hypsoropha baja
8529 – Psammathodoxa cochlidioides
8530 – Cecharismena cara
8532 – Cecharismena nectarea
8532.1 – Cecharismena jalapena
8533 – Cecharismena anartoides
8534 – Plusiodonta compressipalpis, moonseed moth
8535 – Plusiodonta amado
8536 – Calyptra canadensis, Canadian owlet moth
no number yet – Dinumma deponens
8537 – Gonodonta sicheas
8538 – Gonodonta sinaldus
8539 – Gonodonta pyrgo
8540 – Gonodonta nutrix, citrus fruit-piercer moth
8541 – Gonodonta unica
8542 – Gonodonta incurva
8542.1 – Gonodonta bidens
8542.2 – Gonodonta fulvangula
8542.3 – Gonodonta nitidimacula
8543 – Eudocima apta
8543.1 – Eudocima serpentifera
8543.2 – Eudocima tyrannus
8544 – Goniapteryx servia
8545 – Anomis erosa, yellow scallop moth
8546 – Anomis flava, tropical anomis moth
8547 – Anomis privata, hibiscus-leaf caterpillar moth
8548 – Anomis impasta
8549 – Anomis luridula
8550 – Anomis texana
8551 – Anomis illita, okra leafworm moth
8552 – Anomis exacta
8553 – Anomis editrix
8554 – Alabama argillacea, cotton leafworm moth
8555 – Scoliopteryx libatrix, herald moth
8555.1 – Itomia opistographa
8556 – Litoprosopus futilis, palmetto borer moth
8556.1 – Litoprosopus hatuey
8557 – Litoprosopus bahamensis, Bahamian palm owlet moth
8558 – Litoprosopus coachella, palm flower moth
8559 – Litoprosopus confligens
8560 – Diphthera festiva, hieroglyphic moth
no number yet – Xenosoma flaviceps
8561 – Janseodes melanospila
8562 – Concana mundissima
8563 – Lygephila victoria
8564 – Herminocala stigmaphiles
8565 – Obrima rinconada
8565.1 – Obrima pyraloides
8566 – Bandelia angulata
8567 – Euaontia semirufa
8568 – Euaontia clarki
8569.1 – Eulepidotis addens
8570 – Eulepidotis metamorpha
8570.1 – Eulepidotis rectimargo
8570.2 – Eulepidotis electa
8571 – Eulepidotis micca
8571.1 – Eulepidotis striaepuncta
8573 – Metallata absumens, variable metallata moth
8573.1 – Renodes curviluna
8574 – Anticarsia gemmatalis, velvetbean caterpillar moth
8575 – Azeta repugnalis
8576 – Azeta schausi
8577 – Antiblemma rufinans
8578 – Antiblemma filaria
8579 – Antiblemma concinnula
8580 – Goniocarsia electrica
8581 – Epitausa prona
8581.1 – Epitausa coppryi
8582 – Ephyrodes cacata
8583 – Athyrma adjutrix
8583.1 – Athyrma ganglio
8584 – Syllectra erycata
8585 – Epidromia lienaris
8585.2 – Epidromia pannosa
8585.3 – Epidromia rotundata
8585.4 – Manbuta pyraliformis
8586 – Massala obvertens
8587 – Panopoda rufimargo, red-lined panopoda moth
8588 – Panopoda carneicosta, brown panopoda moth
8589 – Panopoda repanda, orange panopoda moth
8590 – Panopoda rigida
8590.1 – Baniana minor
8590.2 – Deinopa angitia
8591 – Phoberia atomaris, common oak moth
8591.1 – Phoberia ingenua
8592 – Cissusa spadix, black-dotted brown moth
8593 – Cissusa mucronata
8594 – Cissusa indiscreta, indiscrete cissusa moth
8596 – Cissusa valens, vigorous cissusa moth
8597 – Litocala sexsignata, litocala moth
8598 – Melipotis perpendicularis
8599 – Melipotis fasciolaris, fasciolated melipotis moth
8600 – Melipotis indomita, indomitable melipotis moth
8601 – Melipotis cellaris, cellar melipotis moth
8602 – Melipotis nigrobasis
8603 – Melipotis januaris, January melipotis moth
8604 – Melipotis famelica
8605 – Melipotis contorta
8606 – Melipotis prolata, prolata melipotis moth
8607 – Melipotis jucunda, merry melipotis moth
8608 – Melipotis agrotoides
8609 – Melipotis novanda
8610 – Melipotis acontioides, royal poinciana moth
8611 – Ianius mosca
8612 – Panula inconstans
8613 – Forsebia perlaeta, forsebia moth
8614 – Bulia deducta
8615 – Bulia similaris
8615.1 – Bulia schausi
8616 – Drasteria mirifica
8616.1 – Drasteria hastingsii
8617 – Drasteria eubapta
8618 – Drasteria graphica, graphic moth
8619 – Drasteria occulta, occult drasteria moth
8620 – Drasteria ingeniculata
8621 – Drasteria scrupulosa
8622 – Drasteria inepta, inept drasteria moth
8623 – Drasteria sabulosa
8625 – Drasteria biformata
8626 – Drasteria ochracea
8627 – Drasteria edwardsii
8628 – Drasteria pallescens
8629 – Drasteria fumosa, smoky arches moth
8630 – Drasteria divergens
8630.1 – Drasteria convergens
8630.2 – Drasteria walshi
8631 – Drasteria petricola, little arches moth
8632 – Drasteria hudsonica, northern arches moth
8633 – Drasteria nubicola
8634 – Drasteria maculosa
8635 – Drasteria perplexa, perplexed arches moth
8636 – Drasteria adumbrata, shadowy arches moth
8637 – Drasteria stretchii
8638 – Drasteria pulchra
8639 – Drasteria howlandii
8640 – Drasteria tejonica
8641 – Drasteria grandirena, figure-seven moth
no number yet – Drasteria parallela
8642 – Hypocala andremona, hypocala moth
8643 – Boryzops purissima
8644 – Orodesma apicina
8645 – Hemeroblemma opigena
no number yet – Hemeroblemma mexicana
8646 – Latebraria amphipyroides
8646.1 – Letis xylia
8647 – Thysania zenobia, owl moth
8649 – Ascalapha odorata, black witch moth
8650 – Tyrissa multilinea
8651 – Lesmone detrahens, detracted owlet moth
8652 – Lesmone fufius
8653 – Lesmone hinna
8654 – Lesmone griseipennis, gray-winged owlet moth
8655 – Lesmone formularis
8656 – Bendisodes aeolia
8657 – Helia agna
8658 – Selenisa sueroides, pale-edged selenisa moth
8659 – Heteranassa mima
8661 – Heteranassa fraterna
8661.1 – Elousa albicans
8662 – Coxina cinctipalpis
8662.1 – Coxina hadenioides
8663 – Euclystis sytis
8664 – Euclystis guerini
8664.1 – Euclystis insana
8665 – Coenipeta bibitrix
8665.1 – Coenipeta medina
8666 – Metria amella, live oak metria moth
8667 – Metria bilineata
8668 – Metria celia
8669 – Kakopoda progenies
8670 – Toxonprucha pardalis, spotted toxonprucha moth
8671 – Toxonprucha strigalis
8672 – Toxonprucha volucris
8673 – Toxonprucha repentis
8673.1 – Toxonprucha diffundens
8674 – Toxonprucha crudelis, cruel toxonprucha moth
8675 – Toxonprucha clientis
8676 – Toxonprucha psegmapteryx
8677 – Zaleops umbrina
8678 – Zaleops paresa
8679 – Matigramma pulverilinea, dusty lined matigramma moth
8680 – Matigramma rubrosuffusa
8680.1 – Matigramma inopinata
8680.2 – Matigramma emmilta
8680.3 – Matigramma adoceta
8681 – Matigramma obscurior
8681.1 – Matigramma repentina
8682 – Acritogramma metaleuca
8682.1 – Acritogramma noctar
8683 – Pseudanthracia coracias, pseudanthracia moth
8684 – Zale exhausta
8684.1 – Zale peruncta
8685 – Zale viridans
8686 – Zale strigimacula
8686.1 – Zale obsita
8687 – Zale fictilis
8688 – Zale sabena
8689 – Zale lunata, lunate zale moth
8690 – Zale smithi
8691 – Zale declarans
8692 – Zale galbanata, maple zale moth
8693 – Zale edusina
8693.1 – Zale chisosensis
8694 – Zale aeruginosa, green-dusted zale moth
8695 – Zale undularis, black zale moth
8696 – Zale insuda
8697 – Zale minerea, colorful zale moth
8698 – Zale phaeocapna
8699 – Zale obliqua, oblique zale moth
8700 – Zale squamularis, gray-banded zale moth
8701 – Zale confusa
8702 – Zale submediana
8703 – Zale duplicata, pine false looper moth
8704 – Zale helata, brown-spotted zale moth
8705 – Zale bethunei, Bethune's zale moth
8706 – Zale buchholzi
8707 – Zale metatoides, washed-out zale moth
8708 – Zale metata
8709 – Zale curema, black-eyed zale moth
8710 – Zale rubiata
8711 – Zale rubi
8712 – Zale termina
8713 – Zale lunifera, bold-based zale moth
8713.1 – Zale intenta
8714 – Zale calycanthata, double-banded zale moth
8715 – Zale colorado
8716 – Zale unilineata, one-lined zale moth
8717 – Zale horrida, horrid zale moth
8718 – Zale perculta, Okefenokee zale moth
8719 – Euparthenos nubilis, locust underwing moth
8720 – Eubolina impartialis, eubolina moth
8721 – Allotria elonympha, false underwing moth
8722 – Ophisma tropicalis
8723 – Mimophisma delunaris
8723.1 – Achaea ablunaris
8724 – Neadysgonia consobrina, consobrina darkwing moth
8725 – Neadysgonia similis
8726 – Neadysgonia smithii, Smith's darkwing moth
8726.1 – Neadysgonia telma
8727 – Parallelia bistriaris, maple looper moth
8728 – Cutina albopunctella
8729 – Cutina distincta, distinguished cypress owlet moth
8729.1 – Cutina aluticolor
8729.2 – Cutina arcuata
8730 – Focillidia texana
8730.1 – Focillidia grenadensis
8731 – Euclidia cuspidea, toothed somberwing moth
8732 – Euclidia ardita
8733 – Caenurgia chloropha, vetch looper moth
8734 – Caenurgia togataria
8735 – Caenurgina annexa
8736 – Caenurgina caerulea
8738 – Caenurgina crassiuscula, clover looper moth
8739 – Caenurgina erechtea, forage looper moth
8740 – Callistege intercalaris
8741 – Callistege diagonalis
8742 – Callistege triangula
8743 – Mocis latipes, small mocis moth
8744 – Mocis marcida, withered mocis moth
8745 – Mocis texana, Texas mocis moth
8746 – Mocis disseverans, yellow mocis moth
8746.1 – Mocis cubana
8747 – Celiptera frustulum, black bit moth
8748 – Celiptera valina
8749 – Ptichodis vinculum, black-tipped ptichodis moth
8750 – Ptichodis herbarum, common ptichodis moth
8750.1 – Ptichodis immunis
8751 – Ptichodis bistrigata, southern ptichodis moth
8752 – Ptichodis pacalis
8753 – Ptichodis ovalis
8754 – Ptichodis bucetum
8755 – Argyrostrotis herbicola
8756 – Argyrostrotis contempta
8757 – Argyrostrotis diffundens
8758 – Argyrostrotis carolina, Carolina chocolate moth
8759 – Argyrostrotis flavistriaria, yellow-lined chocolate moth
8760 – Argyrostrotis sylvarum, woodland chocolate moth
8761 – Argyrostrotis erasa, erasa chocolate moth
8762 – Argyrostrotis quadrifilaris, four-lined chocolate moth
8763 – Argyrostrotis deleta
8764 – Argyrostrotis anilis, short-lined chocolate moth
8765 – Doryodes bistrialis, double-lined doryodes moth
8766 – Doryodes grandipennis
8767 – Doryodes spadaria, dull doryodes moth
8768 – Doryodes tenuistriga
8769 – Spiloloma lunilinea, moon-lined moth
no number yet – Gonodontodes dispar
8770 – Catocala innubens, betrothed underwing moth
8771 – Catocala piatrix, penitent underwing moth
8772 – Catocala consors, consort underwing moth
8773 – Catocala epione, Epione underwing moth
8774 – Catocala muliercula, little wife underwing moth
8775 – Catocala antinympha, sweetfern underwing moth
8777 – Catocala badia, bay underwing moth
8778 – Catocala habilis, habilis underwing moth
8779 – Catocala serena, serene underwing moth
8780 – Catocala robinsonii, Robinson's underwing moth
8781 – Catocala judith, Judith's underwing moth
8782 – Catocala flebilis, mourning underwing moth
8783 – Catocala angusi, Angus' underwing moth
8784 – Catocala obscura, obscure underwing moth
8785 – Catocala residua, residua underwing moth
8786 – Catocala sappho, sappho underwing moth
8787 – Catocala agrippina, Agrippina underwing moth
8787.1 – Catocala atocala, Brou's underwing moth
8788 – Catocala retecta, yellow-gray underwing moth
8788.1 – Catocala luctuosa, Hulst's underwing moth
8789 – Catocala ulalume, Ulalume underwing moth
8790 – Catocala dejecta, dejected underwing moth
8791 – Catocala insolabilis, inconsolable underwing moth
8792 – Catocala vidua, widow underwing moth
8793 – Catocala maestosa, sad underwing moth
8794 – Catocala lacrymosa, tearful underwing moth
8795 – Catocala palaeogama, oldwife underwing moth
8796 – Catocala nebulosa, clouded underwing moth
8797 – Catocala subnata, youthful underwing moth
8798 – Catocala neogama, bride underwing moth
8800 – Catocala aholibah, Aholibah underwing moth
8801 – Catocala ilia, ilia underwing moth
8801.1 – Catocala umbrosa, umber underwing moth
8802 – Catocala cerogama, yellow-banded underwing moth
8803 – Catocala relicta, white underwing moth
8804 – Catocala marmorata, marbled underwing moth
8805 – Catocala unijuga, once-married underwing moth
8806 – Catocala parta, mother underwing moth
8807 – Catocala irene
8808 – Catocala luciana, Luciana underwing moth
8811 – Catocala faustina
8812 – Catocala hermia
8814 – Catocala californica
8817 – Catocala briseis, briseis underwing moth
8818 – Catocala grotiana
8821 – Catocala semirelicta, semirelict underwing moth
8822 – Catocala meskei, Meske's underwing moth
8825 – Catocala jessica, Jessica underwing moth
8829 – Catocala junctura, joined underwing moth
8830 – Catocala texanae
8831 – Catocala electilis
8832 – Catocala cara, darling underwing moth
8832.1 – Catocala carissima, carissima underwing moth
8833 – Catocala concumbens, pink underwing moth
8834 – Catocala amatrix, sweetheart underwing moth
8835 – Catocala delilah, Delilah underwing moth
8835.1 – Catocala desdemona
8835.2 – Catocala caesia
8836 – Catocala andromache, andromache underwing moth
8837 – Catocala frederici
8837.1 – Catocala benjamini
8838 – Catocala chelidonia
8839 – Catocala mcdunnoughi
8840 – Catocala illecta, Magdalen underwing moth
8841 – Catocala abbreviatella, abbreviated underwing moth
8842 – Catocala nuptialis, married underwing moth
8843 – Catocala whitneyi, Whitney's underwing moth
8844 – Catocala amestris, three-staff underwing moth
8845 – Catocala messalina, Messalina underwing moth
8846 – Catocala sordida, sordid underwing moth
8847 – Catocala gracilis, graceful underwing moth
8848 – Catocala louiseae, Louise's underwing moth
8849 – Catocala andromedae, Andromeda underwing moth
8850 – Catocala herodias, Herodias underwing moth
8851 – Catocala coccinata, scarlet underwing moth
8852 – Catocala verrilliana
8853 – Catocala violenta
8854 – Catocala ophelia
8855 – Catocala miranda, Miranda underwing moth
8856 – Catocala orba, orb underwing moth
8857 – Catocala ultronia, ultronia underwing moth
8858 – Catocala crataegi, hawthorn underwing moth
8858.1 – Catocala pretiosa
8860 – Catocala lincolnana, Lincoln underwing moth
8861 – Catocala johnsoniana
8862 – Catocala californiensis
8863 – Catocala mira, wonderful underwing moth
8864 – Catocala grynea, woody underwing moth
8865 – Catocala praeclara, praeclara underwing moth
8867 – Catocala blandula, charming underwing moth
8869 – Catocala alabamae, Alabama underwing moth
8871 – Catocala dulciola, sweet underwing moth
8872 – Catocala clintonii, Clinton's underwing moth
8873 – Catocala similis, similar underwing moth
8874 – Catocala minuta, little underwing moth
8875 – Catocala grisatra, grisatra underwing moth
8876 – Catocala micronympha, little nymph underwing moth
8877 – Catocala connubialis, connubial underwing moth
8878 – Catocala amica, girlfriend underwing moth
8878.1 – Catocala lineella, little lined underwing moth
8879 – Catocala jair, Jair underwing moth
8880 – Abrostola ovalis, oval abrostola moth
8881 – Abrostola urentis, spectacled nettle moth
8882 – Abrostola parvula
8883 – Abrostola microvalis, minute oval abrostola moth
8884 – Mouralia tinctoides
8885 – Argyrogramma verruca, golden looper moth
no number yet – Enigmogramma antillea
8886 – Enigmogramma basigera, pink-washed looper moth
8887 – Trichoplusia ni, cabbage looper moth
8889 – Ctenoplusia oxygramma, sharp-stigma looper moth
8890 – Chrysodeixis includens, soybean looper moth
8890.1 – Chrysodeixis chalcites
8891 – Autoplusia egena, bean-lead skeletonizer moth
8892 – Autoplusia olivacea
8893 – Autoplusia egenoides
8894 – Notioplusia illustrata, notioplusia moth
8895 – Rachiplusia ou, gray looper moth
8896 – Diachrysia aereoides, dark-spotted looper moth
8897 – Diachrysia balluca, green-patched looper moth
8898 – Allagrapha aerea, unspotted looper moth
8899 – Pseudeva purpurigera, straight-lined looper moth
8900 – Pseudeva palligera
8901 – Polychrysia esmeralda
8902 – Polychrysia morigera
8902.1 – Euchalcia borealis
8903 – Euchalcia albavitta
8904 – Chrysanympha formosa, Formosa looper moth
8905 – Eosphoropteryx thyatyroides, pink-patched looper moth
8907 – Megalographa biloba, bilobed looper moth
8908 – Autographa precationis, common looper moth
8909 – Autographa rubidus
8910 – Autographa sansoni
8911 – Autographa bimaculata, two-spotted looper moth
8912 – Autographa mappa, wavy chestnut Y moth
8913 – Autographa pseudogamma
8913.1 – Autographa buraetica
8914 – Autographa californica, alfalfa looper moth
8914.1 – Autographa gamma
8915 – Autographa pasiphaeia
8916 – Autographa flagellum
8917 – Autographa metallica
8918 – Autographa corusca
8919 – Autographa speciosa
8919.1 – Autographa flavida
8920 – Autographa labrosa
8921 – Autographa v-alba
8922 – Syngrapha ottolenguii
8923 – Autographa ampla, large looper moth
8924 – Anagrapha falcifera, celery looper moth
8925 – Syngrapha altera
8926 – Syngrapha octoscripta, dusky silver Y moth
8927 – Syngrapha epigaea, epigaea looper moth
8928 – Syngrapha selecta
8929 – Syngrapha viridisigma, spruce false looper moth
8930 – Syngrapha orophila
8932 – Syngrapha sackenii
8934 – Syngrapha borea
8935 – Syngrapha diasema
8936 – Syngrapha u-aureum
8937 – Syngrapha interrogationis
8938 – Syngrapha surena
8939 – Syngrapha alias
8940 – Syngrapha abstrusa
8941 – Syngrapha cryptica
8942 – Syngrapha rectangula, salt-and-pepper looper moth
8943 – Syngrapha angulidens
8944 – Syngrapha celsa
8945 – Syngrapha montana
8946 – Syngrapha microgamma
8947 – Syngrapha alticola
8948 – Syngrapha parilis
8949 – Syngrapha ignea, mountain beauty moth
8950 – Plusia putnami, Putnam's looper moth
8951 – Plusia nichollae
8951.1 – Plusia magnimacula
8952 – Plusia contexta, connected looper moth
8953 – Plusia venusta, white-streaked looper moth
8954 – Aon noctuiformis, aon moth
8955 – Marathyssa inficita, dark marathyssa moth
8956 – Marathyssa basalis, light marathyssa moth
8956.1 – Marathyssa minus
8957 – Paectes oculatrix, eyed paectes moth
8959 – Paectes pygmaea, pygmy paectes moth
8959.1 – Paectes abrostolella
no number yet – Paectes nana
no number yet – Paectes asper
8961 – Paectes declinata
8962 – Paectes abrostoloides, large paectes moth
8963 – Paectes delineata
8963.1 – Paectes lunodes
8964 – Paectes acutangula
8965 – Paectes nubifera
8967 – Paectes arcigera
8968 – Eutelia pulcherrimus, beautiful eutelia moth
8968.1 – Eutelia pyrastis
8968.2 – Eutelia furcata, Florida eutelia moth
8969 – Baileya doubledayi, Doubleday's baileya moth
8970 – Baileya ophthalmica, eyed baileya moth
8971 – Baileya dormitans, sleeping baileya moth
8971.1 – Baileya acadiana
8972 – Baileya levitans, pale baileya moth
8972.1 – Baileya ellessyoo
8973 – Baileya australis, small baileya moth
8974 – Garella nilotica, black-olive caterpillar moth
8975 – Nycteola frigidana, frigid owlet moth
8976 – Nycteola columbiana
8977 – Nycteola cinereana
8978 – Nycteola metaspilella, forgotten frigid owlet moth
8979 – Nycteola fletcheri
8980 – Iscadia aperta
8981 – Motya abseuzalis
8982 – Collomena filifera
8983 – Meganola minuscula, confused meganola moth
8983.1 – Meganola phylla, coastal plain meganola moth
8983.2 – Meganola spodia, ashy meganola moth
8984 – Meganola minor
8985 – Meganola fuscula
8986 – Meganola dentata
8987 – Meganola varia
8988 – Meganola conspicua
8989 – Nola pustulata, sharp-blotched nola moth
8990 – Nola cilicoides, blurry-patched nola moth
8991 – Nola cereella, sorghum webworm moth
8992 – Nola triquetrana, three-spotted nola moth
8993 – Nola minna, ceanothus nola moth
8994 – Nola aphyla
8995 – Nola ovilla
8996 – Nola clethrae, sweet pepperbush nola moth
8997 – Nola lagunculariae
8998 – Nola apera
8998.1 – Nola cucullatella
8999 – Cydosia aurivitta, straight-lined cydosia moth
9000 – Cydosia nobilitella, curve-lined cydosia moth
9001 – Cydosia curvinella
9002 – Tripudia damozela
9002.1 – Tripudia munna
9003 – Tripudia quadrifera
9003.1 – Tripudia rectangula
9004 – Tripudia grapholithoides
9004.1 – Tripudia chihuahua
9004.2 – Tripudia lamina
9005 – Tripudia balteata
9006 – Tripudia luda
9007 – Tripudia dimidata
9008 – Tripudia luxuriosa
9009 – Tripudia flavofasciata
9010 – Tripudia versutus
9010.1 – Tripudia goyanensis
9011 – Tripudia limbatus
no number yet – Tripudia paraplesia
9012 – Cobubatha metaspilaris
9012.1 – Cobubatha ochrocraspis
9013 – Cobubatha numa
9014 – Cobubatha lixiva
9017 – Cobubatha orthozona
9018 – Cobubatha dividua
9019 – Cobubatha hippotes
9019.1 – Cobubatha ipilla
9019.2 – Cobubatha megaplaga
9020 – Allerastria albiciliatus
9020.1 – Allerastria annae
9021 – Exyra fax, epauletted pitcher-plant moth
9023 – Exyra ridingsii
9024 – Exyra semicrocea
9025 – Oruza albocostaliata, white edge moth
9026 – Oruza albocostata
9027 – Homocerynea cleoriformis
9028 – Phoenicophanta bicolor
9029 – Phoenicophanta modestula
9030 – Ozarba aeria, aerial brown moth
9031 – Ozarba propera
9032 – Ozarba catilina
9033 – Ozarba nebula
9034 – Amiana niama
9035 – Hyperstrotia nana
9036 – Hyperstrotia aetheria
9037 – Hyperstrotia pervertens, dotted graylet moth
9038 – Hyperstrotia villificans, white-lined graylet moth
9039 – Hyperstrotia flaviguttata, yellow-spotted graylet moth
9040 – Hyperstrotia secta, black-patched graylet moth
9041 – Sexserrata hampsoni
9042 – Grotellaforma lactea
9043 – Homolagoa grotelliformis
9044 – Marimatha nigrofimbria, black-bordered lemon moth
9044.1 – Marimatha squala
9044.2 – Marimatha quadrata
9045 – Marimatha tripuncta
9045.1 – Marimatha piscimala
9046 – Deltote bellicula, bog lithacodia moth
9047 – Protodeltote muscosula, large mossy lithacodia moth
9048 – Protodeltote albidula, pale glyph moth
9049 – Maliattha synochitis, black-dotted lithacodia moth
9050 – Maliattha concinnimacula, red-spotted lithacodia moth
9051 – Lithacodia musta, small mossy lithacodia moth
9052 – Lithacodia costaricana
9053 – Pseudeustrotia carneola, pink-barred lithacodia moth
9054 – Pseudeustrotia indeterminata
9055 – Lithacodia phya
9056 – Homophoberia cristata, waterlily owlet moth
9057 – Homophoberia apicosa, black wedge-spot moth
9058 – Neotarache deserticola
9059 – Capis curvata, curved halter moth
9059.1 – Capis archaia
9060 – Argillophora furcilla
9061 – Cerma cora, owl-eyed bird-dropping moth
9062 – Cerma cerintha, tufted bird-dropping moth
9063 – Cerma sirius
9063.1 – Tyta luctuosa
9064 – Cerathosia tricolor
9065 – Leuconycta diphteroides, green leuconycta moth
9066 – Leuconycta lepidula, marbled-green leuconycta moth
9067 – Diastema tigris, lantana moth
9068 – Diastema cnossia
9069 – Amyna bullula, hook-tipped amyna moth
9070 – Amyna axis, eight-spot moth
no number yet – Amyna amplificans
9071 – Aleptina inca
9071.1 – Aleptina junctimacula
9072 – Aleptina aleptivoides
9072.1 – Aleptina clinopetes
9073 – Copibryophila angelica
9074 – Metaponpneumata rogenhoferi, metaponpneumata moth
9075 – Airamia albiocula
9076 – Eublemma minima, everlasting bud moth
9077 – Eublemma cinnamomea
9078 – Eublemma recta, straight-lined seed moth
9079 – Eublemma irresoluta
9080 – Proroblemma testa
9081 – Araeopteron vilhelmina
9082 – Ponometia albitermen
9083 – Ponometia parvula
9084 – Ponometia bicolorata
9085 – Ponometia semiflava, half-yellow moth
9085.1 – Ponometia septuosa
9086 – Ponometia clausula
9087 – Ponometia venustula
9088 – Ponometia virginalis
9089 – Ponometia binocula, prairie bird-dropping moth
9090 – Ponometia candefacta, olive-shaded bird-dropping moth
9091 – Ponometia dorneri
9092 – Ponometia huita
9093 – Ponometia heonyx
9094 – Ponometia cuta
9095 – Ponometia erastrioides, small bird-dropping moth
9096 – Ponometia libedis
9097 – Ponometia nannodes
9098 – Ponometia phecolisca
9099 – Ponometia alata
9100 – Ponometia albimargo
9101 – Ponometia tortricina
9101.1 – Ponometia nigra
9101.2 – Ponometia fumata
9102 – Ponometia fasciatella
9103 – Ponometia hutsoni
9104 – Ponometia pulchra
9105 – Ponometia acutus
9107 – Ponometia altera
9109 – Ponometia elegantula, Arizona bird-dropping moth
9111 – Tarache augustipennis, narrow-winged midget moth
9113 – Tarache huachuca
9115 – Ponometia exigua
9116 – Ponometia macdunnoughi
9117 – Ponometia megocula
9118 – Ponometia tripartita
9119 – Ponometia sutrix
9120 – Tarache idella
9121 – Spragueia magnifica
9122 – Spragueia dama, southern spragueia moth
9123 – Spragueia cleta
9124 – Spragueia perstructana
9125 – Spragueia guttata, spotted spragueia moth
9126 – Spragueia onagrus, black-dotted spragueia moth
9127 – Spragueia leo, common spragueia moth
9128 – Spragueia jaguaralis
9129 – Spragueia funeralis
9130 – Spragueia obatra
9131 – Spragueia apicalis, yellow spragueia moth
9132 – Spragueia margana
9133 – Tarache apela
9134 – Tarache sutor
9135 – Tarache tenuicula
9136 – Tarache aprica, exposed bird-dropping moth
9137 – Tarache lactipennis
9138 – Tarache abdominalis
9139 – Tarache knowltoni
9140 – Tarache flavipennis
9140.1 – Tarache lagunae
9141 – Tarache assimilis
9142 – Tarache quadriplaga
9143 – Tarache tetragona, four-spotted bird-dropping moth
9144 – Tarache dacia
9145 – Tarache terminimaculata, curve-lined bird-dropping moth
9146 – Tarache delecta, delightful bird-dropping moth
9147 – Tarache bella
9148 – Tarache lucasi
9149 – Tarache expolita
9150 – Tarache arida
9151 – Tarache cora
9152 – Tarache major
9153 – Tarache lanceolata
9154 – Tarache sedata
9155 – Tarache acerba
9156 – Tarache axendra
9157 – Tarache bilimeki
9158 – Tarache areloides
9159 – Tarache areli
9159.1 – Tarache toddi
9159.2 – Tarache geminocula
9159.3 – Tarache albifusa
9160 – Acontia chea
9160.1 – Acontia jaliscana
9161 – Acontia cretata, chalky bird-dropping moth
9163 – Acontia coquillettii
9164 – Acontia behrii
9165 – Aleptina semiatra
9166 – Eusceptis flavifrimbriata
9167 – Pseudalypia crotchii
9168 – Bagisara repanda, wavy lined mallow moth
9169 – Bagisara rectifascia, straight lined mallow moth
9170 – Bagisara pacifica
9171 – Bagisara demura
9172 – Bagisara buxea
9173 – Bagisara oula
9174 – Bagisara albicosta
9175 – Bagisara gulnare
9175.1 – Bagisara praecelsa
9175.2 – Bagisara laverna
9176 – Bagisara tristicta
9176.1 – Bagisara brouana
9177 – Panthea acronyctoides, black zigzag moth
9178 – Panthea virginarius
9181 – Panthea gigantea
9182 – Panthea furcilla, eastern panthea moth
9183.1 – Panthea apanthea
9183.2 – Panthea judyae
9183.3 – Panthea greyi
9184 – Colocasia flavicornis, yellowhorn moth
9185 – Colocasia propinquilinea, closebanded yellowhorn moth
9186 – Pseudopanthea palata
9187 – Lichnoptera decora
9188 – Charadra franclemonti
9188.1 – Charadra tapa
9189 – Charadra deridens, laugher moth
9189.1 – Charadra moneta
9190 – Charadra dispulsa
9191 – Meleneta antennata
9192 – Raphia abrupta, abrupt brother moth
9193 – Raphia frater, brother moth
9194 – Raphia piazzi
9196 – Raphia elbea
9197 – Raphia pallula
9198 – Raphia cinderella
9199 – Acronicta rubricoma, ruddy dagger moth
9200 – Acronicta americana, American dagger moth
9201 – Acronicta hastulifera, frosted dagger moth
9202 – Acronicta insita
9203 – Acronicta dactylina, fingered dagger moth
9205 – Acronicta lepusculina, cottonwood dagger moth
9205.1 – Acronicta cyanescens
9206 – Acronicta vulpina, miller dagger moth
9207 – Acronicta innotata, unmarked dagger moth
9208 – Acronicta betulae, birch dagger moth
9209 – Acronicta radcliffei, Radcliffe's dagger moth
9210 – Acronicta tota
9211 – Acronicta tritona, triton dagger moth
9212 – Acronicta grisea, gray dagger moth
9214 – Acronicta falcula
9216 – Acronicta albarufa
9217 – Acronicta exempta
9219 – Acronicta connecta, connected dagger moth
9220 – Acronicta rapidan
9221 – Acronicta funeralis, funerary dagger moth
9222 – Acronicta paupercula
9223 – Acronicta lepetita
9224 – Acronicta quadrata
9225 – Acronicta vinnula, delightful dagger moth
9226 – Acronicta superans, splendid dagger moth
9227 – Acronicta laetifica, pleasant dagger moth
9229 – Acronicta hasta, speared dagger moth
9230 – Acronicta thoracica
9231 – Acronicta strigulata
9231.1 – Acronicta browni
9232 – Acronicta atristrigatus
9234 – Acronicta beameri
9235 – Acronicta spinigera, nondescript dagger moth
9236 – Acronicta morula, ochre dagger moth
9237 – Acronicta interrupta, interrupted dagger moth
9238 – Acronicta lobeliae, greater oak dagger moth
9238.1 – Acronicta perblanda
9239 – Acronicta valliscola
9241 – Acronicta fragilis, fragile dagger moth
9241.1 – Acronicta heitzmani, Heitzman's dagger moth
9242 – Acronicta exilis, exiled dagger moth
9243 – Acronicta ovata, ovate dagger moth
9244 – Acronicta modica, medium dagger moth
9245 – Acronicta haesitata, hesitant dagger moth
9246 – Acronicta clarescens, clear dagger moth
9247 – Acronicta tristis
9248 – Acronicta hamamelis, witch hazel dagger moth
9249 – Acronicta increta, southern oak dagger moth
9250 – Acronicta inclara, unclear dagger moth
9251 – Acronicta retardata, retarded dagger moth
9254 – Acronicta afflicta, afflicted dagger moth
9255 – Acronicta brumosa, charred dagger moth
9256 – Acronicta marmorata, marble dagger moth
9257 – Acronicta impleta, yellow-haired dagger moth
9258 – Acronicta sperata
9259 – Acronicta noctivaga, night-wandering dagger moth
9261 – Acronicta impressa, impressed dagger moth
9264 – Acronicta longa, long-winged dagger moth
9265 – Acronicta extricata
9266 – Acronicta lithospila, streaked dagger moth
9267 – Acronicta barnesii
9268 – Acronicta perdita
9269 – Acronicta edolata
9270 – Acronicta othello
9272 – Acronicta oblinita, smeared dagger moth
9272.1 – Acronicta sinescripta
9273 – Acronicta sagittata
9274 – Acronicta lanceolaria
9275 – Acronicta lupini
9275.1 – Acronicta australis
9276 – Acronicta spinea
9277 – Acronicta dolli
9280 – Simyra insularis, Henry's marsh moth
9281 – Agriopodes fallax, green marvel moth
9282 – Agriopodes geminata
9283 – Agriopodes tybo
9284 – Anterastria teratophora, gray marvel moth
9285 – Polygrammate hebraeicum, Hebrew moth
9286 – Harrisimemna trisignata, Harris's three-spot moth
9287 – Cryphia olivacea
9288 – Cryphia fascia
9289 – Cryphia flavidior
9290 – Cryphia oaklandiae
9291 – Cryphia nana
9292 – Cryphia cuerva, cryphia moth
9293 – Cryphia pallidioides
9295 – Cryphia sarepta
9296 – Bryolymnia viridata
9297 – Cryphia albipuncta
9297.1 – Cryphia flavipuncta
9297.2 – Elaphria cyanympha
9297.5 – Pseudomarimatha flava
9298 – Xerociris wilsonii, Wilson's wood-nymph moth
9299 – Eudryas unio, pearly wood-nymph moth
9300 – Eudryas brevipennis
9301 – Eudryas grata, beautiful wood-nymph moth
9302 – Gerra radicalis
9303 – Gerra sevorsa
9304 – Gerrodes minatea
9305 – Neotuerta hemicycla
9306 – Caularis lunata
9307 – Euscirrhopterus gloveri, purslane moth
9307.1 – Euscirrhopterus poeyi, pullback moth
9308 – Euscirrhopterus cosyra, staghorn cholla moth
9309 – Psychomorpha epimenis, grapevine epimenis moth
9311 – Eupseudomorpha brillians
9312 – Alypiodes bimaculata, two-spotted forester moth
9313 – Alypiodes geronimo
9314 – Alypia octomaculata, eight-spotted forester moth
9316 – Alypia wittfeldii, Wittfeld's forester moth
9318 – Alypia langtoni, Langton's forester moth
9319 – Alypia ridingsii, Ridings' forester moth
9320 – Alypia mariposa
9321 – Androloma maccullochii, MacCulloch's forester moth
9322 – Androloma disparata
9325 – Apamea cuculliformis
9326 – Apamea verbascoides
9327 – Apamea inebriata
9328 – Apamea nigrior, black-dashed apamea moth
9329 – Apamea cariosa
9329.1 – Apamea quinteri
9331 – Apamea cristata
9332 – Apamea vulgaris, common apamea moth
9332.1 – Apamea wikeri
9333 – Apamea lignicolora, wood-colored apamea moth
9333.1 – Apamea atriclava
9334 – Apamea antennata
9334.1 – Apamea siskiyou
9336 – Apamea atrosuffusa
9337 – Apamea maxima
9337.1 – Apamea robertsoni
9338 – Apamea acera
9339 – Apamea auranticolor
9339.1 – Apamea sora
9339.2 – Apamea tahoensis
9340 – Apamea genialis
9341 – Apamea vultuosa, airy apamea moth
9343 – Apamea apamiformis, rice worm moth
9344 – Apamea plutonia, dusky apamea moth
9345 – Apamea perpensa
9346 – Apamea occidens, western apamea moth
9347 – Apamea albina
9348 – Apamea amputatrix, yellow-headed cutworm moth
9348.1 – Apamea walshi
9350 – Apamea smythi
9351 – Apamea alia
9351.1 – Apamea xylodes
9353 – Apamea inordinata
9354 – Apamea centralis
9355 – Apamea unita
9356 – Apamea spaldingi
9357 – Apamea cinefacta
9359 – Apamea commoda
9360 – Apamea impulsa
9361 – Melanapamea mixta
9362 – Apamea indocilis, ignorant apamea moth
9362.1 – Apamea remissa
9362.2 – Apamea unanimis, small clouded brindle moth
9364 – Apamea sordens, bordered apamea moth
9364.1 – Apamea digitula
9365 – Apamea scoparia
9367 – Apamea dubitans, doubtful apamea moth
9367.1 – Apamea cogitata, thoughtful apamea moth
9368 – Apamea geminimacula
9369 – Apamea inficita, lined Quaker moth
9372 – Apamea lutosa
9372.1 – Apamea fergusoni
9373 – Apamea helva, yellow three-spot moth
9374 – Apamea niveivenosa, snowy-veined apamea moth
9378 – Apamea burgessi
9380 – Apamea relicina
9382 – Apamea devastator, glassy cutworm moth
9383 – Apamea longula
9383.1 – Apamea bernardino
9384.1 – Apamea alticola
9384.2 – Apamea rubrirena
9385 – Apamea zeta
9385.1 – Lateroligia ophiogramma, double lobed moth
9386 – Resapamea trigona
9387 – Resapamea innota
9388 – Resapamea venosa
9389 – Resapamea enargia
9391 – Resapamea passer, dock rustic moth
9393 – Resapamea stipata, four-lined borer moth
no number yet – Resapamea diluvius
no number yet – Resapamea angelika
no number yet – Resapamea mammuthus
9394 – Apamea contradicta
9395 – Apamea lintneri, sand wainscot moth
9396 – Eremobina claudens, dark-winged Quaker moth
9398 – Eremobina leucoscelis
9399 – Eremobina unicincta
9401 – Xylomoia indirecta, oblique brocade moth
9402 – Oligia chlorostigma
9403 – Aseptis marina
9404 – Oligia modica, black-banded brocade moth
9405 – Oligia tusa
9406 – Mesapamea fractilinea, broken-lined brocade moth
9407 – Mesapamea arbora
9408 – Neoligia exhausta, exhausted brocade moth
9410 – Neoligia crytora
9411 – Neoligia semicana
9411.1 – Neoligia canadensis
9411.2 – Neoligia atlantica
9412 – Neoligia subjuncta
9412.1 – Neoligia inermis
9412.2 – Neoligia pagosa
9412.3 – Neoligia hardwicki
9412.4 – Neoligia surdirena
9413 – Neoligia tonsa
9413.1 – Neoligia rubirena
9413.2 – Neoligia invenusta
9413.3 – Neoligia elephas
9413.4 – Neoligia albirena
9413.5 – Neoligia lancea
9413.6 – Neoligia lillooet
9414 – Oligia violacea
9414.1 – Oligia rampartensis
9415 – Oligia bridghamii, Bridgham's brocade moth
9415.1 – Oligia strigilis, marbled minor moth
9415.2 – Oligia latruncula
9416 – Oligia minuscula, small brocade moth
9417 – Oligia egens, Neumogen's Quaker moth
9418 – Oligia obtusa
9419 – Platypolia mactata, adorable brocade moth
9420 – Fishia illocata, wandering brocade moth
9421 – Euros cervina
9421.1 – Euros osticollis
9422 – Euros proprius
9423 – Cobalos angelicus
9424 – Cobalos franciscanus
9425 – Meropleon cosmion
9425.1 – Meropleon cinnamicolor
9425.2 – Meropleon linae
9426 – Meropleon titan
9427 – Meropleon diversicolor, multicolored sedgeminer moth
9428 – Meropleon ambifusca
9429 – Lemmeria digitalis, fingered lemmeria moth
9430 – Selicanis cinereola, selicanis moth
9431 – Parastichtis suspecta
9432 – Photedes didonea
9433 – Xylomoia chagnoni
9433.1 – Orthomoia bloomfieldi
9434 – Photedes includens, included cordgrass borer moth
9434.1 – Photedes carterae
9435 – Photedes inops
9436 – Photedes panatela, northern cordgrass borer moth
9437 – Hypocoena inquinata
9437.1 – Hypocoena sofiae
9439 – Hypocoena basistriga
9440 – Hypocoena rufostrigata
9440.1 – Hypocoena stigmatica
9441 – Photedes enervata
9443 – Photedes defecta
9444 – Franclemontia interrogans
9445 – Benjaminiola colorada
9446 – Mammifrontia leucania
9447 – Mammifrontia rileyi
9447.1 – Mammifrontia sarae
9447.2 – Rhizedra lutosa, large wainscot moth
9448 – Capsula alameda
9449 – Capsula oblonga, oblong sedge borer moth
9450 – Capsula subflava, subflava sedge borer moth
9451 – Capsula laeta
9452 – Macronoctua onusta, iris borer moth
9453 – Helotropha reniformis, reniform celaena moth
no number yet – Cherokeea attakullakulla
9454 – Loscopia velata, veiled ear moth
9454.1 – Loscopia roblei
9454.2 – Protapamea danieli
9454.3 – Protapamea louisae
9455 – Amphipoea lunata
9456 – Amphipoea interoceanica, interoceanic ear moth
9457 – Amphipoea americana, American ear moth
9457.1 – Amphipoea pacifica
9458 – Amphipoea cottlei
9459 – Amphipoea senilis
9460 – Amphipoea keiferi
9461 – Amphipoea erepta
9463 – Parapamea buffaloensis, buffalo moth
9464 – Papaipema cerina, golden borer moth
9465 – Papaipema duovata, seaside goldenrod borer moth
9466 – Papaipema cataphracta, burdock borer moth
9467 – Papaipema sulphurata, water willow stem borer moth
9468 – Papaipema aerata
9469 – Papaipema polymniae, cup plant borer moth
9470 – Papaipema araliae, aralia shoot borer moth
9471 – Papaipema arctivorens, northern burdock borer moth
9472 – Papaipema harrisii, heracleum stem borer moth
9473 – Papaipema impecuniosa, aster borer moth
9474 – Papaipema sauzalitae, figwort stem borer moth
9475 – Papaipema angelica, angelica borer moth
9476 – Papaipema verona, Verona borer moth
9477 – Papaipema astuta, yellow stoneroot borer moth
9478 – Papaipema leucostigma, columbine borer moth
9479 – Papaipema lysimachiae, loosestrife borer moth
9480 – Papaipema pterisii, bracken borer moth
9481 – Papaipema stenocelis, chain fern borer moth
9482 – Papaipema speciosissima, osmunda borer moth
9483 – Papaipema inquaesita, sensitive fern borer moth
9484 – Papaipema rutila, mayapple borer moth
9485 – Papaipema baptisiae, indigo stem borer moth
9485.1 – Papaipema limata
9486 – Papaipema birdi, umbellifer borer moth
9487 – Papaipema pertincta, groundsel borer moth
9488 – Papaipema insulidens, ragwort stem borer moth
9489 – Papaipema dribi, rare borer moth
9490 – Papaipema nepheleptena, turtle head borer moth
9491 – Papaipema circumlucens, hop stalk borer moth
9492 – Papaipema marginidens, brick-red borer moth
9493 – Papaipema appassionata, pitcher-plant borer moth
9494 – Papaipema eryngii, rattlesnake-master borer moth
9495 – Papaipema furcata, ash tip borer moth
9496 – Papaipema nebris, stalk borer moth
9497 – Papaipema necopina, sunflower borer moth
9498 – Papaipema silphii, silphius borer moth
9499 – Papaipema duplicatus, dark stoneroot borer moth
9500 – Papaipema maritima, maritime sunflower borer moth
9501 – Papaipema eupatorii, eupatorium borer moth
9502 – Papaipema nelita, coneflower borer moth
9503 – Papaipema rigida, rigid sunflower borer moth
9504 – Papaipema aweme, awame borer moth
9505 – Papaipema cerussata, ironweed borer moth
9506 – Papaipema sciata, Culver's root borer moth
9507 – Papaipema limpida, vernonia borer moth
9508 – Papaipema beeriana, blazing star borer moth
9509 – Papaipema unimoda, meadow rue borer moth
9510 – Hydraecia pallescens
9511 – Hydraecia medialis
9512 – Hydraecia obliqua
9513 – Hydraecia immanis, hop vine borer moth
9514 – Hydraecia micacea, rosy rustic moth
9515 – Hydraecia perobliqua
9516 – Hydraecia stramentosa
9517 – Hydraecia intermedia
9518 – Hydraecia ximena
9519 – Hydraecia columbia
9520 – Achatodes zeae, elder shoot borer moth
9520.1 – Acrapex relicta
9521 – Peraniana dissociata
9522 – Iodopepla u-album, white-eyed borer moth
9522.1 – Alastria chico
9523 – Bellura gortynoides, white-tailed diver moth
9523.1 – Bellura vulnifica
9524 – Bellura brehmei
9525 – Bellura obliqua, cattail borer moth
9525.1 – Bellura anoa
9526 – Bellura densa, pickerelweed borer moth
9527 – Aseptis fumosa
9528 – Aseptis catalina
9529 – Aseptis perfumosa
9529.1 – Aseptis pseudolichena
9530 – Aseptis fumeola
9531 – Aseptis ethnica
9531.1 – Aseptis fanatica (misspelled as Aseptis fannatica)
9531.2 – Aseptis ferruginea
9531.3 – Aseptis murina
9532 – Aseptis binotata
9533 – Aseptis adnixa
9534 – Aseptis paviae
9535 – Aseptis pausis
9536 – Aseptis genetrix
9537 – Aseptis dilara
9538 – Aseptis cara
9539 – Aseptis susquesa
9540 – Aseptis monica
9541 – Aseptis serrula
9541.1 – Aseptis torreyana
9542 – Aseptis bultata
9543 – Aseptis characta
9544 – Euplexia triplaga
9545 – Euplexia benesimilis, American angle shades moth
9546 – Phlogophora iris, olive angle shades moth
9547 – Phlogophora periculosa, brown angle shades moth
9548 – Conservula anodonta, sharp angle shades moth
9549 – Enargia decolor, pale enargia moth
9550 – Enargia infumata, smoked sallow moth
9550.2 – Enargia fausta
9552 – Ipimorpha nanaimo
9553 – Ipimorpha viridipallida
9555 – Ipimorpha pleonectusa, even-lined sallow moth
9556 – Chytonix palliatricula, cloaked marvel moth
9557 – Chytonix sensilis
9558.1 – Niphonyx segregata
9559 – Oligia divesta
9560 – Dypterygia rozmani, American bird's-wing moth
9560.1 – Dypterygia ligata
9561 – Dypterygia patina
9561.1 – Dypterygia ordinarius
9561.2 – Dypterygia punctirena
9562 – Dypterygia dolens
9562.1 – Acroria terens
9563 – Andropolia diversilineata
9564 – Andropolia contacta, Canadian giant moth
9565 – Apamea pallifera
9568 – Fishia dispar
9569 – Andropolia olorina
9570 – Andropolia aedon
9571 – Andropolia theodori
9572 – Andropolia olga
9574 – Aseptis lichena
9575 – Rhizagrotis cloanthoides
9576 – Rhizagrotis albalis
9577 – Pseudohadena vulnerea
9578 – Hyppa xylinoides, common hyppa moth
9579 – Hyppa contrasta
9579.1 – Hyppa potamus
9580 – Hyppa brunneicrista
9581 – Hyppa indistincta
9582 – Nedra ramosula, gray half-spot moth
9583 – Nedra stewarti
9584 – Nedra dora
9585 – Nedra hoeffleri
9586 – Agrotisia evelinae
9587 – Properigea loculosa
9588 – Properigea albimacula, white-spotted properigea moth
9589 – Properigea costa, barrens moth
9590 – Properigea continens
9591 – Properigea mephisto
9592 – Properigea tapeta
9593 – Properigea seitzi
9594 – Properigea suffusa
9595 – Properigea perolivalis
9596 – Properigea niveirena
no number yet – Perigea bahamica
9597 – Hemibryomima chryselectra
9598 – Pseudobryomima distans
9599 – Pseudobryomima muscosa, mossy pseudobryomima moth
9600 – Pseudobryomima fallax
9601 – Pseudanarta flavidens
9602 – Pseudanarta actura
9603 – Pseudanarta basivirida
9604 – Pseudanarta caeca
9605 – Pseudanarta crocea
9606 – Pseudanarta flava
9607 – Pseudanarta singula
9608 – Pseudanarta pulverulenta
9609 – Pseudanarta exasperata
9610 – Pseudanarta perplexa
9611 – Pseudanarta damnata
9612 – Pseudanarta vexata
9613 – Pseudanarta daemonalis
9614 – Homoanarta falcata
9615 – Homoanarta peralta
9616 – Homoanarta carneola
9617 – Pseudanthoecia tumida
9618 – Phosphila turbulenta, turbulent phosphila moth
9619 – Phosphila miselioides, spotted phosphila moth
9620 – Miracavira brillians
9621 – Miracavira sylvia
9622 – Cropia connecta
9622.1 – Cropia ruthaea
9623 – Cropia templada
9624 – Phosphila fernae
9625 – Speocropia trichroma
9626 – Trachea delicata
9627 – Paratrachea viridescens
9628 – Neophaenis boucheri
9629 – Fagitana littera, marsh fern moth
9630 – Callopistria floridensis, Florida fern moth
9630.1 – Callopistria jamaicensis
9631 – Callopistria mollissima, pink-shaded fern moth
9632 – Callopistria granitosa, granitose fern moth
9633 – Callopistria cordata, silver-spotted fern moth
9634 – Phuphena tura
9636 – Acherdoa ferraria, chocolate moth
9637 – Magusa orbifera
9637.1 – Magusa divaricata, orbed narrow-wing moth
9638 – Amphipyra pyramidoides, copper underwing moth
9639 – Amphipyra tragopoginis, mouse moth
9640 – Amphipyra glabella, smooth amphipyra moth
9641 – Amphipyra brunneoatra
9642 – Protoperigea anotha
9643 – Protoperigea posticata
9643.1 – Protoperigea umbricata
9643.2 – Protoperigea subterminata
9643.3 – Protoperigea parvulata
9643.4 – Protoperigea calientensis
9644 – Micrathetis triplex, triplex cutworm moth
9645 – Micrathetis costiplaga
9646 – Micrathetis tecnion
9647 – Proxenus miranda, Miranda moth
9648 – Proxenus mindara
9649 – Proxenus mendosa
9650 – Athetis tarda, slowpoke moth
9651 – Anorthodes triquetra
9652 – Anorthodes indigena
9653 – Caradrina morpheus, mottled rustic moth
9654 – Caradrina meralis, rare sand Quaker moth
9655 – Caradrina camina
9655.1 – Caradrina beta
9656 – Caradrina montana, civil rustic moth
9657 – Caradrina multifera, speckled rustic moth
9658 – Caradrina mona
9659 – Caradrina atrostriga
9660 – Caradrina distinctoides
9660.1 – Caradrina clavipalpis, pale mottled willow moth
9661 – Crambodes talidiformis, verbena moth
9662 – Balsa malana, many-dotted appleworm moth
9663 – Balsa tristrigella, three-lined balsa moth
9664 – Balsa labecula, white-blotched balsa moth
9665 – Spodoptera exigua, beet armyworm moth
9666 – Spodoptera frugiperda, fall armyworm moth
9667 – Spodoptera praefica, western yellowstriped armyworm moth
9668 – Spodoptera pulchella, Caribbean armyworm moth
9669 – Spodoptera ornithogalli, yellow-striped armyworm moth
9670 – Spodoptera latifascia, velvet armyworm moth
9671 – Spodoptera dolichos, dolichos armyworm moth
9671.1 – Spodoptera androgea, androgea armyworm moth
9672 – Spodoptera eridania, southern armyworm moth
9673 – Spodoptera albula, gray-streaked armyworm moth
9674 – Spodoptera hipparis
9675 – Elaphria fuscimacula
9676 – Elaphria nucicolora, sugarcane midget moth
9677 – Elaphria agrotina
9678 – Elaphria versicolor, variegated midget moth
9678.1 – Elaphria devara
9679 – Elaphria chalcedonia, chalcedony midget moth
9679.1 – Elaphria deltoides
9680 – Elaphria georgei, George's midget moth
9681 – Elaphria festivoides, festive midget moth
9681.1 – Elaphria alapallida, pale-winged midget moth
9681.2 – Elaphria cornutinus
9682 – Elaphria exesa, exesa midget moth
9682.1 – Elaphria subobliqua
9683 – Bryolymnia ensina
9683.1 – Bryolymnia biformata
9684 – Elaphria grata, grateful midget moth
9685 – Bryolymnia viridimedia
9685.1 – Bryolymnia marti
9685.2 – Bryolymnia mixta
9686 – Bryolymnia semifascia, half-banded bryolymnia moth
9686.1 – Bryolymnia anthracitaria
9687 – Gonodes liquida
9688 – Galgula partita, wedgling moth
9689 – Perigea xanthioides, red groundling moth
9689.1 – Perigea berinda
9689.2 – Perigea enixa
9690 – Condica videns, white-dotted groundling moth
9691 – Condica temecula
9692 – Condica discistriga
9693 – Condica mobilis, mobile groundling moth
9694 – Condica mersa
9695 – Condica albolabes
9696 – Condica vecors, dusky groundling moth
9697 – Condica orta
9698 – Condica concisa
9699 – Condica sutor, cobbler moth
9700 – Condica claufacta
9701 – Condica proxima
9701.1 – Condica punctifera
9702 – Condica albigera
9702.1 – Condica vacillans
9702.2 – Condica parista
9703 – Condica hypocritica
9704 – Condica revellata
9705 – Condica leucorena
9707 – Condica andrena
9708 – Condica lunata
9709 – Condica begallo
9710 – Condica egestis
9711 – Condica ignota
9712 – Condica morsa
9713 – Condica cupentia, splotched groundling moth
9714 – Condica confederata, Confederate moth
9715 – Stibaera curvilineata
9716 – Stibaera thyatiroides, whaleback moth
9717 – Emarginea pallida
9718 – Emarginea percara, beloved emarginea moth
9719 – Emarginea dulcinea
9720 – Ogdoconta cinereola, common pinkband moth
9721 – Ogdoconta moreno
9722 – Ogdoconta sexta
9723 – Ogdoconta altura
9724 – Ogdoconta tacna
no number yet – Ogdoconta fergusoni
no number yet – Ogdoconta rufipenna
no number yet – Ogdoconta satana
9725 – Azenia obtusa, obtuse yellow moth
9726 – Azenia edentata
9727 – Azenia perflava
9728 – Azenia virida
9729 – Azenia implora
9730 – Azenia templetonae
9731 – Narthecophora pulverea
9732 – Lythrodes radiatus
9733 – Lythrodes venatus
9734 – Lythrodes tripuncta
9735 – Heminocloa mirabilis
9736 – Bistica noela
9737 – Neumoegenia poetica, poetry moth
9740 – Plagiomimicus ochoa
9741 – Plagiomimicus aureolum
9741.1 – Plagiomimicus heitzmani
9742 – Plagiomimicus olvello
9743 – Cuahtemoca unicum
9744 – Plagiomimicus manti
9745 – Plagiomimicus dimidiata
9746 – Plagiomimicus astigmatosum
9747 – Plagiomimicus curiosum
9748 – Plagiomimicus spumosum, frothy moth
9748.1 – Plagiomimicus caesium
9750 – Plagiomimicus hilli
9750.1 – Plagiomimicus kathyae
9751 – Plagiomimicus navia
9752 – Plagiomimicus expallidus
9753 – Plagiomimicus triplagiatus
9754 – Plagiomimicus pityochromus, black-barred brown moth
9755 – Plagiomimicus tepperi
9755.1 – Plagiomimicus mimica
9756 – Lineostriastiria hutsoni
9757 – Lineostriastiria olivalis
9758 – Lineostriastiria hachita
9759 – Lineostriastiria sexseriata
9760 – Lineostriastiria biundulalis
9761 – Chrysoecia scira
9763 – Chrysoecia gladiola
9764 – Chrysoecia atrolinea
9765 – Cirrhophanus dyari
9766 – Cirrhophanus triangulifer, goldenrod stowaway moth
9766.1 – Cirrhophanus pretiosa
9767 – Eulithosia plesioglauca
9768 – Eulithosia papago
9768.1 – Angulostiria chryseochilus
9769 – Eulithosia discistriga
9770 – Hoplolythrodes arivaca
9771 – Xanthothrix neumoegeni
9772 – Xanthothrix ranunculi
9773 – Eulithosia composita
9774 – Chrysoecia thoracica
9775 – Chalcopasta territans
9776 – Chalcopasta howardi
9777 – Chalcopasta fulgens
9778 – Chalcopasta acema
9779 – Argentostiria koebelei
9780 – Basilodes chrysopis
9781 – Basilodes pepita, gold moth
9781.1 – Basilodes straminea
9783 – Stiria blanchardi
9784 – Stiria consuela
9785 – Stiria rugifrons, yellow sunflower moth
9785.1 – Stiria intermixta
9786 – Stiria dyari
9787 – Stiria sulphurea
9787.1 – Stiria satana
9788 – Fala ptychophora
9789 – Chamaeclea pernana
9790 – Chamaeclea basiochrea
9791 – Oslaria viridifera, green oslaria moth
9792 – Oslaria pura
9793 – Nocloa plagiata
9794 – Nocloa rivulosa
9795 – Nocloa pallens
9796 – Nocloa cordova
9797 – Nocloa nanata
9798 – Nocloa pilacho
9799 – Nocloa alcandra
9800 – Nocloa aliaga
9801 – Nocloa duplicatus
9802 – Paramiana callaisata
9803 – Paramiana smaragdina
9804 – Paramiana marina
9805 – Paramiana perissa
9806 – Paramiana canoa
9806.1 – Euamiana endopolia
9807 – Euamiana contrasta
9807.1 – Euamiana adusta
9808 – Euamiana dissimilis
9809 – Euamiana torniplaga
9810 – Ruacodes tela
9811 – Petalumaria californica
9812 – Redingtonia alba
9813 – Cosmia epipaschia
9814 – Cosmia praeacuta
9814.1 – Cosmia elisae
9815 – Cosmia calami, American dun-bar moth
9816 – Zotheca tranquilla, elder moth
9817 – Thurberiphaga diffusa
9818 – Amolita fessa, feeble grass moth
9819 – Amolita obliqua, oblique grass moth
9820 – Amolita sentalis
9821 – Amolita roseola
9822 – Amolita fratercula
9823 – Amolita delicata
9824 – Hemioslaria pima
9825 – Acopa carina
9826 – Acopa perpallida
9827 – Nacopa bistrigata
9828 – Nacopa melanderi
9829 – Prothrinax luteomedia
9830 – Walterella ocellata
9831 – Escaria clauda
9832 – Escaria homogena
9833 – Fotella notalis
9837 – Cephalospargeta elongata
9838 – Rhizagrotis modesta
9839 – Aleptinoides ochrea
9840 – Anycteola fotelloides
9841 – Afotella cylindrica
9842 – Fota armata
9843 – Fota minorata
9844 – Gloanna grisescens
9844.1 – Gloanna hecate
9845 – Podagra crassipes
9846 – Policocnemis ungulatus
9847 – Minofala instans
9848 – Eviridemas minuta
9849 – Axenus arvalis
9850 – Annaphila danistica
9851 – Annaphila hennei
9852 – Annaphila mera
9853 – Annaphila pustulata
9854 – Annaphila arvalis
9855 – Annaphila abdita
9855.1 – Annaphila scurlockorum
9856 – Annaphila baueri
9857 – Annaphila astrologa
9858 – Annaphila vivianae
9859 – Annaphila pseudoastrologa
9860 – Annaphila olgae
9861 – Annaphila ida
9862 – Annaphila divinula
9863 – Annaphila lithosina
9864 – Annaphila miona
9865 – Annaphila casta
9866 – Annaphila depicta
9867 – Annaphila macfarlandi
9868 – Annaphila decia
9869 – Annaphila diva
9870 – Annaphila superba
9871 – Annaphila spila
9872 – Annaphila evansi
9873 – Xylena nupera, American swordgrass moth
9874 – Xylena curvimacula, dot-and-dash swordgrass moth
9875 – Xylena thoracica
9876 – Xylena cineritia, gray swordgrass moth
9877 – Xylena brucei
9878 – Lithomoia germana
9879 – Homoglaea variegata
9880 – Homoglaea californica
9881 – Homoglaea hircina, goat sallow moth
9882 – Homoglaea dives
9883 – Homoglaea carbonaria
9884 – Litholomia napaea
9885 – Lithophane semiusta
9886 – Lithophane patefacta, dimorphic pinion moth
9887 – Lithophane bethunei, Bethune's pinion moth
9888 – Lithophane innominata, nameless pinion moth
9888.1 – Lithophane franclemonti
9888.99 – Lithophane nr. innominata
9889 – Lithophane petulca, wanton pinion moth
9891 – Lithophane amanda
9892 – Lithophane disposita, dashed gray pinion moth
9893 – Lithophane hemina, hemina pinion moth
9893.1 – Lithophane lanei
9893.2 – Lithophane joannis
9894 – Lithophane oriunda, immigrant pinion moth
9895 – Lithophane signosa, signate pinion moth
9896 – Lithophane gausapata
9897 – Lithophane contra
9898 – Lithophane longior
9898.1 – Lithophane boogeri
9899 – Lithophane lemmeri
9899.1 – Lithophane thujae, cedar pinion moth
9900 – Lithophane subtilis
9901 – Lithophane contenta
9902 – Lithophane baileyi, Bailey's pinion moth
9904 – Lithophane querquera, shivering pinion moth
9904.1 – Lithophane scottae
9905 – Lithophane viridipallens, pale green pinion moth
9906 – Lithophane pruena
9907 – Lithophane puella
9908 – Lithophane laceyi
9909 – Lithophane tepida
9910 – Lithophane antennata, ashen pinion moth
9911 – Lithophane torrida
9912 – Lithophane pertorrida
9913 – Lithophane georgii
9914 – Lithophane laticinerea
9915 – Lithophane grotei, Grote's pinion moth
9916 – Lithophane unimoda, dowdy pinion moth
9917 – Lithophane fagina, hoary pinion moth
9918 – Lithophane tarda
9919 – Lithophane tephrina
9920 – Lithophane itata
9922 – Lithophane pexata
9923 – Lithophane dilatocula
9923.1 – Lithophane leeae
9924 – Lithophane atara
9924.1 – Lithophane ponderosa
9924.2 – Lithophane jefferyi
9925 – Lithophane lepida
9925.1 – Lithophane adipel
9926 – Lithophane nasar
9927 – Lithophane vanduzeei
9928 – Lithophane thaxteri, Thaxter's pinion moth
9928.1 – Lithophane abita
9929 – Pyreferra hesperidago, mustard sallow moth
9930 – Pyreferra citrombra, citrine sallow moth
9931 – Pyreferra ceromatica
9932 – Pyreferra pettiti
9933 – Eupsilia vinulenta, straight-toothed sallow moth
9933.1 – Eupsilia sidus, sidus sallow moth
9934 – Eupsilia cirripalea, Franclemont's sallow moth
9935 – Eupsilia tristigmata, three-spotted sallow moth
9936 – Eupsilia morrisoni, Morrison's sallow moth
9937 – Eupsilia knowltoni
9938 – Eupsilia fringata
9939 – Eupsilia devia, lost sallow moth
9941 – Sericaglaea signata, variable sallow moth
9942 – Xystopeplus rufago, red-winged sallow moth
9943 – Metaxaglaea inulta, unsated sallow moth
9944 – Metaxaglaea viatica, roadside sallow moth
9945 – Metaxaglaea semitaria, footpath sallow moth
9945.1 – Metaxaglaea australis, southern sallow moth
9945.2 – Metaxaglaea violacea, holly sallow moth
9946 – Epiglaea decliva, sloping sallow moth
9947 – Epiglaea apiata, pointed sallow moth
9948 – Chaetaglaea cerata, waxed sallow moth
9948.1 – Chaetaglaea fergusoni, Ferguson's sallow moth
9949 – Chaetaglaea tremula, trembling sallow moth
9950 – Chaetaglaea sericea, silky sallow moth
no number yet – Chaetaglaea rhonda
9951 – Psectraglaea carnosa
9952 – Eucirroedia pampina, scalloped sallow moth
9953 – Mesogona olivata
9953.1 – Mesogona rubra
9953.2 – Mesogona subcuprea
9954 – Agrochola purpurea
9955 – Agrochola pulchella
9956 – Agrochola lota
9957 – Sunira bicolorago, bicolored sallow moth
9958 – Sunira decipiens
9960 – Sunira verberata, battered sallow moth
9961 – Anathix ralla, dotted sallow moth
9962 – Anathix puta, Puta sallow moth
9963 – Anathix aggressa
9965 – Xanthia tatago, pink-barred sallow moth
9966 – Hillia maida
9967 – Hillia iris, iris rover moth
9970 – Fishia discors
9971 – Fishia connecta
9972 – Fishia yosemitae
no number yet – Fishia nigrescens
9976 – Platypolia anceps
9977 – Platypolia contadina
9978 – Platypolia loda
9979 – Xylotype capax, broad sallow moth
9980 – Xylotype arcadia, Acadian sallow moth
9981 – Dryotype opina
9982 – Mniotype adjusta
9983 – Mniotype pallescens
9987 – Mniotype ducta
9988 – Mniotype tenera
9989 – Sutyna privata
9992 – Pachypolia atricornis
9993 – Brachylomia populi
9994 – Brachylomia elda
9995 – Brachylomia rectifascia
9995.1 – Brachylomia pallida
9995.2 – Brachylomia cascadia
9996 – Brachylomia curvifascia
9996.1 – Brachylomia obscurifascia
9997 – Brachylomia thula
9997.1 – Brachylomia sierra
9998 – Brachylomia algens
9999 – Brachylomia discinigra
10001 – Brachylomia discolor
10002 – Epidemas cinerea
10003 – Epidemas obscurus
10005 – Feralia jocosa, joker moth
10006 – Feralia deceptiva, deceptive sallow moth
10007 – Feralia major, major sallow moth
10008 – Feralia comstocki, Comstock's sallow moth
10009 – Feralia februalis
10010 – Feralia meadowsi
10011 – Brachionycha borealis
10012 – Psaphida electilis, chosen sallow moth
10013 – Psaphida grandis, gray sallow moth
10014 – Psaphida rolandi, Roland's sallow moth
10015 – Psaphida damalis
10016 – Psaphida styracis, fawn sallow moth
10017 – Pseudocopivaleria sonoma
10018 – Pseudocopivaleria anaverta
10019 – Psaphida resumens, figure-eight sallow moth
10020 – Psaphida thaxterianus
10021 – Copivaleria grotei, Grote's sallow moth
10022 – Apsaphida eremna
10023 – Viridemas galena
10024 – Supralathosea baboquivariensis
10025 – Provia argentata
10026 – Pleromella opter
10027 – Pleromelloida conserta
10029 – Pleromelloida bonuscula
10030 – Pleromelloida arizonata
10031 – Pleromelloida cinerea, ashy pleromelloida moth
10032 – Neogalea sunia, lantana stick moth
10033 – Catabena lineolata, fine-lined sallow moth
10034 – Catabena sagittata
10035 – Supralathosea pronuba
10036 – Catabenoides vitrina
10037 – Catabenoides terminellus
10038 – Catabenoides divisa
10039 – Oxycnemis advena
10040 – Sympistis orbicularis
10041 – Sympistis subsimplex
10042 – Sympistis franclemonti
10042.1 – Sympistis shait
10042.2 – Sympistis saxatilis
10042.3 – Sympistis opleri
10043 – Oxycnemis gracillinia
10044 – Oxycnemis acuna
10045 – Oxycnemis gustis
10046 – Oxycnemis fusimacula
10047 – Oxycnemis erratica
10048 – Oxycnemis grandimacula
10049 – Leucocnemis perfundis
10050 – Leucocnemis nivalis
10051 – Leucocnemis obscurella
10052 – Leucocnemis variabilis
10053 – Tristyla alboplagiata
10054 – Sympistis apposita
10055 – Sympistis dentata, toothed apharetra moth
10055.1 – Sympistis anweileri
10058 – Sympistis californiae
10059 – Sympistis badistriga, brown-lined sallow moth
10060 – Sympistis induta
10061 – Sympistis inconstans
10062 – Sympistis stabilis
10063 – Sympistis rustica
10063.1 – Sympistis kelsoensis
10064 – Sympistis incomitata
10065 – Sympistis infixa, broad-lined sallow moth
10066 – Sympistis fifia
10066.1 – Sympistis dinalda
10066.2 – Sympistis kappa
10067 – Sympistis chionanthi, fringe-tree sallow moth
no number yet – Sympistis forbesi
10068 – Sympistis fortis
10068.1 – Sympistis picina
10069 – Sympistis mirificalis
10070 – Sympistis dayi
10071 – Sympistis euta
10072 – Sympistis hayesi
10072.1 – Sympistis anubis
10073 – Sympistis regina
10074 – Sympistis corusca
10074.1 – Sympistis sorapis
10075 – Sympistis kelloggii
10076 – Sympistis albifasciata
10077 – Sympistis melantho
10077.1 – Sympistis acheron
10077.2 – Sympistis cocytus
10078 – Sympistis sandaraca
10079 – Sympistis pudorata
10080 – Sympistis tenuifascia
10081 – Sympistis parvanigra
10081.1 – Sympistis parvacana
10082 – Sympistis lepipoloides
10082.1 – Sympistis tartarea
10082.2 – Sympistis baloghi
10082.3 – Sympistis jenniferae
10082.4 – Sympistis osiris
10082.5 – Sympistis isis
10082.6 – Sympistis horus
10083 – Sympistis glennyi
10085 – Sympistis terminalis
10085.1 – Sympistis coprocolor
10086 – Sympistis linda
10087 – Sympistis benjamini
10088 – Sympistis deceptiva
10089 – Sympistis basifugens
10090 – Sympistis modesta
10091 – Sympistis balteata
10092 – Sympistis iricolor
10093 – Sympistis levis
10093.1 – Sympistis incubus
10093.2 – Sympistis duplex
10093.3 – Sympistis seth
10093.4 – Sympistis sesmu
10093.5 – Sympistis insanina
10094 – Sympistis sanina
10094.1 – Sympistis sakhmet
10094.2 – Sympistis ptah
10094.3 – Sympistis jocelynae
10094.4 – Sympistis poliochroa
10095 – Sympistis simplex
10095.1 – Sympistis lachrymosa
10095.2 – Sympistis goedeni
10096 – Sympistis augustus
10097 – Sympistis nita
10098 – Sympistis meadiana
10099 – Sympistis saundersiana, Saunders' sallow moth
10100 – Sympistis fasciata
10101 – Sympistis occata
10102 – Sympistis pernotata
10102.1 – Sympistis apis
10102.2 – Sympistis buchis
10103 – Sympistis polingii
10104 – Sympistis homogena
10104.1 – Sympistis sobek
10104.2 – Sympistis ra
10104.3 – Sympistis khem
10104.4 – Sympistis septu
10104.5 – Sympistis hathor
10105 – Sympistis heterogena
10105.1 – Sympistis cleopatra
10106 – Sympistis arizonensis
10107 – Sympistis melalutea
10108 – Sympistis viriditincta
10109 – Sympistis singularis
10110 – Sympistis wilsonensis
10111 – Unciella primula
10112 – Unciella flagrantis
10113 – Sympistis chorda
10113.1 – Sympistis hapi
10113.2 – Sympistis sokar
10113.3 – Sympistis dischorda
10113.4 – Sympistis buto
10113.5 – Sympistis extremis
10113.6 – Sympistis doris
10114 – Sympistis rosea
10115 – Sympistis bakeri
10116 – Sympistis youngi
10118 – Sympistis columbia
10118.1 – Sympistis pallida
10118.2 – Sympistis helena
10118.3 – Sympistis cherti
10119 – Sympistis punctilinea
10119.1 – Sympistis rayata
10120 – Sympistis deserta
10121 – Sympistis barnesii
10122 – Sympistis umbrifascia
10122.1 – Sympistis satanella
10123 – Sympistis piffardi
10123.1 – Sympistis chalybdis
10124 – Sympistis cibalis
10124.1 – Sympistis amenthes
10125 – Sympistis laticosta
10126 – Sympistis lacticollis
10127 – Sympistis nigrocaput
10128 – Sympistis atricollaris
10129 – Sympistis cottami
10130 – Sympistis figurata
10130.1 – Sympistis disfigurata
10130.2 – Sympistis pallidior
10131 – Sympistis minor
10131.1 – Sympistis greyi
10132 – Sympistis ragani
10133 – Sympistis semicollaris
10133.1 – Sympistis collaris
10134 – Sympistis astrigata
10134.1 – Sympistis babi
10135 – Sympistis riparia
10135.1 – Sympistis aqualis
10135.2 – Sympistis amun
10135.4 – Sympistis major
10135.5 – Sympistis richersi
10135.6 – Sympistis mut
10135.7 – Sympistis chons
10135.8 – Sympistis nenun
10136 – Sympistis obscurata
10137 – Sympistis intruda
10138 – Sympistis ciliata
10139 – Sympistis curvicollis
10139.1 – Sympistis pachet
10140 – Sympistis chandleri
10142 – Sympistis sagittata
10142.1 – Sympistis shirleyae
10143 – Sympistis mackiei
10144 – Sympistis ibapahensis
10145 – Sympistis extranea
10146 – Sympistis utahensis
10147 – Sympistis tetrops
10147.1 – Sympistis knudsoni
10147.2 – Sympistis khepri
10147.3 – Sympistis min
10148 – Sympistis griseicollis
10149 – Sympistis sectilis
10150 – Sympistis sectiloides
10150.1 – Sympistis bes
10151 – Sympistis dunbari
10151.1 – Sympistis definita
10152 – Sympistis poliafascies
10153 – Sympistis toddi
10154 – Sympistis perscripta, scribbled sallow moth
10155 – Sympistis behrensi
10156 – Sympistis heliophila
10157 – Sympistis lapponica
10158 – Sympistis wilsoni
10159 – Sympistis nigrita
10162 – Sympistis funebris
10163 – Stylopoda cephalica
10164 – Sympistis aterrima
10164.1 – Sympistis apep
10165 – Stylopoda groteana
10166 – Stylopoda modestella
10167 – Stylopoda anxia
10168 – Copanarta sexpunctata
10169 – Copanarta aurea
10171 – Pseudacontia louisa
10172 – Pseudacontia crustaria
10173 – Pseudacontia cansa
10174 – Triocnemis saporis
10174.98 – Triocnemidini n. gen., Triocnemidini new genus
10175 – Crimona pallimedia
10176 – Rhizagrotis stylata
10177 – Calophasia lunula, toadflax brocade moth
10178 – Behrensia conchiformis
10179 – Behrensia bicolor
10180 – Cucullia pulla
10181 – Cucullia dammersi
10183 – Cucullia strigata, streaked hooded owlet moth
10184 – Cucullia serraticornis
10185 – Cucullia comstocki
10187.2 – Cucullia albida
10188 – Dolocucullia dentilinea
10189 – Supralothosea obtusa
10190 – Cucullia speyeri, Speyer's hooded owlet moth
10190.1 – Cucullia styx
10190.2 – Cucullia dorsalis
10191 – Cucullia laetifica
10191.1 – Cucullia lethe
10191.2 – Cucullia charon
10192 – Cucullia alfarata, camphorweed owlet moth
10192.1 – Cucullia eccissica
10193 – Dolocucullia minor
10194 – Cucullia intermedia, intermediate hooded owlet moth
10194.1 – Cucullia umbratica
10195 – Cucullia similaris
10196 – Cucullia lilacina
10197 – Cucullia florea, gray-hooded-owlet moth
10198 – Cucullia postera
10199 – Cucullia omissa, omitted hooded owlet moth
10200 – Cucullia asteroides, asteroid moth
10201 – Cucullia montanae, mountain hooded owlet moth
10201.1 – Cucullia eucaena
10202 – Cucullia convexipennis, brown-hooded owlet moth
10203 – Cucullia oribac
10205 – Cucullia luna
10206 – Cucullia antipoda
10206.1 – Cucullia eurekae
10207 – Cucullia basipuncta
10208 – Cucullia mcdunnoughi
10209 – Cucullia eulepis
10210 – Cucullia cucullioides
10212 – Cucullia incresa
10213 – Cucullia heinrichi
10214 – Cucullia astigma
10216 – Opsigalea blanchardi
10217 – Emariannia cucullidea
10218 – Sparkia immacula
10219 – Trichocosmia inornata
10220 – Trichocosmia drasteroides
10221 – Hadenella pergentilis
10222 – Anarta chartaria
10223 – Anarta trifolii, nutmeg moth
10224 – Anarta mutata, mutant moth
10225 – Anarta fulgora
10226 – Anarta castrae
10227 – Anarta hamata
10228 – Anarta oregonica
10228.1 – Anarta columbica
10228.2 – Anarta montanica
10229 – Anarta alta
10230 – Anarta subalbida
10231 – Anarta obesula
10232 – Anarta farnhami
10233 – Anarta crotchii
10233.1 – Anarta fusculenta
10234 – Anarta oaklandiae
10236 – Anarta projecta
10237 – Trudestra hadeniformis
10238 – Scotogramma submarina
10239 – Scotogramma fervida
10240 – Scotogramma densa
10241 – Scotogramma stretchii
10242 – Scotogramma harnardi
10243 – Scotogramma addenda
10244 – Scotogramma ptilodonta
10245 – Scotogramma megaera
10246 – Scotogramma hirsuta
10247 – Scotogramma yakima
10248 – Scotogramma orida
10249 – Scotogramma gatei
10250 – Scotogramma fieldi
10251 – Scotogramma deffessa
10252 – Scotogramma inconcinna
10253 – Tridepia nova
10255 – Anarta edwardsii
10256 – Sideridis fuscolutea
10257 – Anarta florida
10258 – Anarta antica
10259 – Anarta decepta
10260 – Sideridis mojave
10261 – Sideridis uscripta
10262 – Sideridis ruisa
10263 – Sideridis artesta
10264 – Sideridis vindemialis
10265 – Sideridis rosea, rosewing moth
10266 – Sideridis congermana, German cousin moth
10267 – Tricholita palmillo
10268 – Sideridis maryx, maroonwing moth
10269 – Admetovis oxymorus
10270 – Admetovis similaris
10270.1 – Hecatera dysodea, small ranunculus moth
10271 – Mamestra configurata
10272 – Mamestra curialis
10273 – Polia discalis
10274 – Polia piniae
10275 – Polia nimbosa, stormy arches moth
10276 – Polia imbrifera, cloudy arches moth
10277 – Polia rogenhoferi
10277.1 – Polia propodea
10279 – Polia richardsoni
10280 – Polia purpurissata, purple arches moth
10281 – Polia nugatis
10282 – Orthodes noverca
10283 – Orthodes vauorbicularis
10284 – Orthodes delecta
10285 – Hexorthodes tuana
10286 – Hexorthodes nipana
10288 – Orthodes detracta, disparaged arches moth
10289 – Orthodes goodelli, Goodell's arches moth
10290 – Orthodes obscura
10291 – Morrisonia latex, fluid arches moth
10292 – Melanchra adjuncta, hitched arches moth
10293 – Melanchra picta, zebra caterpillar moth
10294 – Melanchra pulverulenta
10295 – Melanchra assimilis, black arches moth
10296 – Lacanobia nevadae, Nevada arches moth
10297 – Lacanobia atlantica, Atlantic arches moth
10298 – Lacanobia radix, garden arches moth
10299 – Lacanobia subjuncta, speckled cutworm moth
10300 – Lacanobia grandis, grand arches moth
10301 – Spiramater lutra, otter spiramater moth
10302 – Trichordestra rugosa, wrinkled trichordestra moth
10303 – Trichordestra tacoma
10304 – Trichordestra legitima, striped garden caterpillar moth
10305 – Trichordestra dodii
10306 – Trichordestra beanii
10307 – Trichordestra lilacina, aster cutworm moth
10308 – Trichordestra liquida
10309 – Trichordestra prodeniformis
10310 – Papestra quadrata
10311 – Papestra biren
10312 – Papestra cristifera
10313 – Papestra brenda
10314 – Papestra invalida
10315 – Lasionycta secedens
10316 – Hadena ectypa
10317 – Hadena capsularis, capsule moth
10317.1 – Hadena lafontainei
10318 – Hadena minorata
10319 – Hadena amabilis
10321 – Hadena ectrapela
10322 – Hadena circumvadis
10322.1 – Hadena caelestis
10322.2 – Hadena gabrieli
10323 – Hadena plumasata
10323.1 – Hadena maccabei
10323.2 – Hadena paulula
10323.3 – Hadena siskiyou
10324 – Hada sutrina, sutrina moth
10325 – Hadena glaciata
10326 – Hadena variolata
10327 – Anarta nigrolunata
10328 – Anarta sierrae
10332 – Coranarta luteola
10332.1 – Coranarta macrostigma
10334 – Lasionycta staudingeri
10335 – Lasionycta quadrilunata
10336 – Lasionycta leucocycla
10337 – Lasionycta coloradensis
10337.1 – Lasionycta flanda
10337.2 – Lasionycta coracina
10337.3 – Lasionycta anthracina
10338 – Lasionycta lagganata
10338.1 – Lasionycta carolynae
10339 – Lasionycta impingens
10339.2 – Lasionycta phaea
10339.3 – Lasionycta skraelingia
10339.4 – Lasionycta taigata
10340 – Lasionycta discolor
10340.1 – Lasionycta mono
10341 – Lasionycta phoca
10342 – Lasionycta luteola
10344 – Lasionycta promulsa
10345 – Lasionycta macleani
10345.1 – Lasionycta pulverea
10345.2 – Lasionycta silacea
10345.3 – Lasionycta sierra
10346 – Lasionycta uniformis
10346.1 – Lasionycta brunnea
10346.2 – Lasionycta caesia
10346.3 – Lasionycta gelida
10348 – Lasionycta poca
10348.1 – Lasionycta illima
10348.2 – Lasionycta frigida
10348.3 – Lasionycta sasquatch
10350 – Lasionycta dolosa
10350.1 – Lasionycta subfumosa
10351 – Lacinipolia mimula
10352 – Lasionycta perplexa
10352.1 – Lasionycta perplexella
10352.2 – Lasionycta subalpina
10356 – Lasionycta subdita
10358 – Lasionycta subfuscula
10359 – Lasionycta benjamini
10360 – Lasionycta mutilata
10360.1 – Lasionycta haida
10362 – Lasionycta conjugata
10362.1 – Lasionycta fergusoni
10364 – Psammopolia arietis
10365 – Psammopolia wyatti
10366 – Psammopolia insolens
10366.1 – Psammopolia sala
10367 – Psammopolia ochracea
10368 – Lacinipolia meditata, thinker moth
10370 – Lacinipolia lustralis
10371 – Lacinipolia cuneata, cuneate arches moth
10372 – Lacinipolia anguina, snaky arches moth
10373 – Lacinipolia incurva
10374 – Lacinipolia longiclava
10375 – Lacinipolia gnata
10376 – Lacinipolia agnata
10377 – Lacinipolia prognata
10377.1 – Lacinipolia delongi
10378 – Lacinipolia luteimacula
10379 – Lacinipolia umbrosa
10380 – Lacinipolia vittula
10381 – Lacinipolia naevia
10382 – Lacinipolia stenotis
10383 – Lacinipolia palilis
10384 – Lacinipolia uliginosa
10385 – Lacinipolia canities
10387 – Lacinipolia selama
10389 – Lacinipolia roseosuffusa
10390 – Lacinipolia falsa
10391 – Lacinipolia francisca
10392 – Lacinipolia leucogramma
10393 – Lacinipolia teligera
10394 – Lacinipolia vicina
10394.1 – Lacinipolia subalba
10395 – Lacinipolia pensilis
10396 – Lacinipolia basiplaga
10397 – Lacinipolia renigera, bristly cutworm moth
10398 – Lacinipolia stricta, brown arches moth
10399 – Lacinipolia circumcincta
10400 – Lacinipolia spiculosa
10401 – Lacinipolia lepidula
10402 – Lacinipolia perta
10403 – Lacinipolia erecta
10403.1 – Lacinipolia triplehorni
10405 – Lacinipolia lorea, bridled arches moth
10406 – Lacinipolia olivacea, olive arches moth
10406.1 – Lacinipolia bucketti
10406.2 – Lacinipolia baueri
10406.3 – Lacinipolia sharonae
10406.4 – Lacinipolia fordi
10406.5 – Lacinipolia franclemonti
10406.6 – Lacinipolia aileenae
10406.7 – Lacinipolia rodora
10407 – Lacinipolia davena
10408 – Lacinipolia comis
10409 – Lacinipolia rectilinea
10410 – Lacinipolia lunolacta
10411 – Lacinipolia laudabilis, laudable arches moth
10412 – Lacinipolia marinitincta
10413 – Lacinipolia explicata, explicit arches moth
10414 – Lacinipolia implicata, implicit arches moth
10415 – Lacinipolia strigicollis, collared arches moth
10417 – Lacinipolia tricornuta
10418 – Lacinipolia runica
10419 – Lacinipolia viridifera
10420 – Lacinipolia consimilis
10421 – Lacinipolia buscki
10422 – Lacinipolia quadrilineata
10422.1 – Lacinipolia martini
10423 – Lacinipolia patalis
10424 – Lacinipolia parvula
10425 – Trichocerapoda comstocki
10425.1 – Trichocerapoda harbisoni
10426 – Trichocerapoda strigata
10427 – Trichocerapoda oblita
10427.1 – Trichocerapoda oceanis
10428 – Dargida procinctus, olive green cutworm moth
10429 – Dargida grammivora
10430 – Dargida quadrannulata
10431 – Dargida diffusa, wheat head armyworm moth
10432 – Dargida terrapictalis
10433 – Dargida tetera
10434 – Dargida rubripennis, pink streak moth
10435 – Dargida aleada
10436 – Mythimna oxygala, lesser wainscot moth
10437 – Mythimna yukonensis
10438 – Mythimna unipuncta, armyworm moth
10438.1 – Mythimna sequax, wheat armyworm moth
10439 – Leucania extincta
10440 – Leucania linita
10441 – Leucania farcta
10441.1 – Leucania oregona, Oregon wainscot moth
10442 – Leucania anteroclara
10443 – Leucania februalis
10444 – Leucania phragmitidicola, phragmites wainscot moth
10445 – Leucania linda, Linda wainscot moth
10446 – Leucania multilinea, many-lined wainscot moth
10446.1 – Leucania lapidaria
10447 – Leucania commoides
10447.1 – Leucania dorsalis
10449 – Leucania insueta
10449.1 – Leucania dia
10450 – Leucania incognita
10450.1 – Leucania inconspicua
10451 – Leucania oaxacana
10451.1 – Leucania lobrega
10452 – Leucania imperfecta
10453 – Leucania stolata
10453.1 – Leucania subpunctata, forage armyworm moth
10455 – Leucania scirpicola, scirpus wainscot moth
10455.1 – Leucania senescens
10456 – Leucania adjuta, adjutant wainscot moth
10457 – Leucania infatuans
10458 – Leucania humidicola, sugarcane budworm moth
10459 – Leucania inermis, unarmed wainscot moth
10460 – Leucania calidior
10461 – Leucania ursula, Ursula wainscot moth
10462 – Leucania pseudargyria, false wainscot moth
10463 – Leucania pilipalpis
10464 – Perigonica tertia
10466 – Perigonica fulminans
10467 – Perigonica eldana
10468 – Perigonica angulata
10469 – Perigonica pectinata
10470 – Acerra normalis
10471 – Stretchia plusiaeformis
10472 – Stretchia pictipennis
10473 – Stretchia muricina
10474 – Stretchia pacifica
10475 – Stretchia inferior
10476 – Stretchia prima
10477 – Orthosia erythrolita
10478 – Orthosia pulchella
10479 – Orthosia transparens
10480 – Orthosia praeses
10481 – Orthosia mys
10482 – Orthosia ferrigera
10484 – Orthosia terminata
10485 – Orthosia behrensiana
10487 – Orthosia rubescens, ruby Quaker moth
10488 – Orthosia garmani, Garman's Quaker moth
10489 – Orthosia arthrolita
10490 – Orthosia revicta, subdued Quaker moth
10491 – Orthosia alurina, gray Quaker moth
10492 – Orthosia desperata
10493 – Orthosia segregata
10494 – Orthosia pacifica
10495 – Orthosia hibisci, speckled green fruitworm moth
10496 – Orthosia flaviannula
10497 – Orthosia annulimacula
10498 – Orthosia tenuimacula
10499 – Orthosia mediomacula
10500 – Orthosia nongenerica
10501 – Crocigrapha normani, Norman's Quaker moth
10502 – Himella fidelis, intractable Quaker moth
10503 – Egira baueri
10504 – Egira variabilis
10505 – Egira hiemalis
10506 – Egira simplex
10507 – Egira vanduzeei
10508 – Egira crucialis
10509 – Egira cognata
10510 – Egira februalis, mottled oak woodling moth
10511 – Egira curialis
10513 – Egira dolosa
10514 – Egira rubrica
10515 – Egira perlubens, brown woodling moth
10516 – Egira purpurea
10517 – Egira alternans, alternate woodling moth
10518 – Achatia distincta, distinct Quaker moth
10519 – Morrisonia mucens, gray Quaker moth
10520 – Morrisonia evicta, bicolored woodgrain moth
10521 – Morrisonia confusa, confused woodgrain moth
10521.1 – Morrisonia triangula
10522 – Cerapteryx graminis, antler moth
10523 – Tholera americana
10524 – Nephelodes minians, bronzed cutworm moth
10525 – Nephelodes demaculata
10526 – Nephelodes mendica
10527 – Nephelodes adusta
10528 – Nephelodes carminata
10529 – Anhimella perbrunnea
10530 – Anhimella contrahens
10531 – Anhimella pacifica
10532 – Homorthodes furfurata, northern scurfy Quaker moth
10532.1 – Homorthodes lindseyi, southern scurfy Quaker moth
10533 – Homorthodes communis, alder Quaker moth
10534 – Homorthodes fractura
10535 – Homorthodes discreta
10536 – Homorthodes dubia
10537 – Homorthodes mania
10538 – Homorthodes rubritincta
10539 – Homorthodes hanhami
10540 – Homorthodes carneola
10541 – Homorthodes reliqua
10542 – Homorthodes rectiflava
10543 – Homorthodes flosca
10544 – Homorthodes perturba
10545 – Homorthodes gigantoides
10546 – Protorthodes curtica
10549 – Protorthodes eureka
10552 – Protorthodes incincta, banded Quaker moth
10554 – Protorthodes smithii
10555 – Protorthodes argentoppida
10556 – Protorthodes perforata
10557 – Protorthodes rufula, rufous Quaker moth
10558 – Protorthodes antennata
10559 – Protorthodes alfkenii
10560 – Nudorthodes texana
10561 – Nudorthodes variabilis
10562 – Protorthodes mulina
10563 – Protorthodes oviduca, ruddy Quaker moth
10565 – Protorthodes orobia
10566 – Protorthodes melanopis
no number yeat – Protorthodes texicana
no number yeat – Protorthodes ustulata
no number yeat – Nudorthodes molino
10567 – Ulolonche culea, sheathed Quaker moth
10568 – Ulolonche consopita
10569 – Ulolonche modesta
10570 – Ulolonche fasciata
10571 – Ulolonche marloffi
10572 – Ulolonche dilecta
10573 – Ulolonche disticha
10574 – Ulolonche orbiculata
10575 – Ulolonche niveiguttata
10576 – Hyperepia jugifera
10578 – Pseudorthodes vecors, small brown Quaker moth
10579 – Pseudorthodes calceolaris
10580 – Pseudorthodes imora
10581 – Pseudorthodes keela
10582 – Pseudorthodes irrorata
10583 – Pseudorthodes puerilis
10584 – Pseudorthodes virgula
10585 – Orthodes majuscula, rustic Quaker moth
10586 – Orthodes furtiva
10587 – Orthodes cynica, cynical Quaker moth
10588 – Orthodes adiastola
10589 – Orthodes bolteri
10590 – Synorthodes auriginea
10591 – Synorthodes typhedana
10592 – Hexorthodes serrata
10593 – Hexorthodes inconspicua
10594 – Hexorthodes jocosa
10596 – Hexorthodes agrotiformis
10597 – Hypotrix trifascia
10597.1 – Hyssia degenerans
10598 – Hexorthodes euxoiformis
10599 – Hypotrix alamosa
10600 – Hypotrix hueco
10601 – Hexorthodes accurata
10602 – Hexorthodes senatoria
10603 – Hexorthodes catalina
10603.1 – Hexorthodes citeria
10603.2 – Hexorthodes emendata
10604 – Hypotrix optima
10605 – Eriopyga crista
10605.1 – Pseudorthodes iole
10605.2 – Fergusonix januaris
10606 – Hypotrix lunata
10607 – Zosteropoda hirtipes, v-lined Quaker moth
10608 – Zosteropoda clementei
10609 – Neleucania suavis
10610 – Neleucania patricia
10611 – Neleucania bicolorata
10612 – Neleucania niveicosta
10613 – Neleucania praegracilis
10614 – Hypotrix ferricola
10615 – Hypotrix diplogramma
10616 – Hypotrix parallela
10616.1 – Hypotrix rubra
10617 – Anhypotrix tristis
10618 – Trichopolia dentatella
10619 – Trichopolia suspicionis
10620 – Hypotrix spinosa
10620.1 – Hypotrix ocularis
10620.2 – Hypotrix basistriga
10620.3 – Hypotrix naglei
10621 – Trichofeltia circumdata
10622 – Mimobarathra antonito
10623 – Miodera stigmata
10624 – Miodera eureka
10625 – Engelhardtia ursina
10626 – Tricholita elsinora
10627 – Tricholita signata, signate Quaker moth
10628 – Tricholita notata
10629 – Tricholita baranca
10629.1 – Tricholita knudsoni
10629.2 – Tricholita ferrisi
10630 – Tricholita fistula
10631 – Tricholita chipeta
10632 – Tricholita bisulca
10633 – Marilopteryx lutina
10633.1 – Marilopteryx carancahua
10634 – Lophoceramica artega
10635 – Hydroeciodes juvenilis
10636 – Hydroeciodes repleta
10637 – Hydroeciodes serrata
10638 – Hydroeciodes ochrimacula
10639 – Hydroeciodes auripurpura
10640 – Xanthopastis timais, Spanish moth
10641 – Agrotis vetusta, old man dart moth
10642 – Agrotis daedalus
10642.1 – Agrotis striata
10643 – Eucoptocnemis dollii
10643.1 – Eucoptocnemis canescens
10644 – Feltia mollis
10645 – Agrotis orthogonia
10647 – Agrotis ruta
10647.1 – Agrotis longicornis
10648 – Agrotis gladiaria, swordsman dart moth
10649 – Agrotis kingi
10650 – Agrotis robustior
10651 – Agrotis venerabilis, venerable dart moth
10652 – Agrotis vancouverensis
10653 – Agrotis gravis
10654 – Agrotis buchholzi
10658 – Agrotis stigmosa
10658.1 – Agrotis arenarius
10659 – Agrotis volubilis, voluble dart moth
10660 – Agrotis obliqua
10660.1 – Agrotis antica
10661 – Agrotis malefida, rascal dart moth
10662 – Agrotis apicalis
10663 – Agrotis ipsilon, ipsilon dart moth
10664 – Feltia subterranea, subterranean dart moth
10665 – Feltia repleta, replete dart moth
10666 – Feltia manifesta
10667 – Dichagyris triphaenoides
10668 – Agrotis haesitans
10669 – Agrotis rileyana
10670 – Feltia jaculifera, dingy cutworm moth
10670.1 – Feltia inyoca
10672 – Feltia evanidalis
10674 – Feltia subgothica, subgothic dart moth
10675 – Feltia tricosa, confused dart moth
10676 – Feltia herilis, Master's dart moth
10680 – Feltia geniculata, knee-joint dart moth
10680.1 – Feltia floridensis
10680.2 – Feltia austrina
10681 – Copablepharon grandis
10682 – Copablepharon canariana
10684 – Copablepharon serrata
10684.1 – Copablepharon mustelini
10684.2 – Copablepharon serratigrande
10686 – Copablepharon gillaspyi
10686.1 – Copablepharon pictum
10686.2 – Copablepharon nevada
10686.3 – Copablepharon mutans
10686.4 – Copablepharon columbia
10686.5 – Copablepharon alaskensis
10687 – Copablepharon viridisparsa
10687.1 – Copablepharon robertsoni
10689 – Copablepharon longipenne
10689.1 – Copablepharon michiganensis
10690 – Copablepharon absidum
10690.1 – Copablepharon fuscum, sand-verbena moth
10690.2 – Copablepharon atrinotum
10691 – Copablepharon sanctaemonicae
10691.1 – Copablepharon opleri
10692 – Protogygia album
10692.1 – Protogygia pallida
10693 – Copablepharon albisericea
10693.1 – Copablepharon spiritum
10693.2 – Copablepharon flavum
10694 – Eucoptocnemis fimbriaris, fringed dart moth
10696 – Eucoptocnemis dapsilis
10696.1 – Eucoptocnemis rufula
10697 – Eucoptocnemis elingua
10698 – Feltia nigrita
10698.1 – Feltia woodiana
10698.2 – Feltia troubridgei
10698.3 – Feltia boreana
10698.4 – Feltia beringiana
10699 – Dichagyris longidens
10700 – Dichagyris dubitata
10701 – Dichagyris ruckesi
10701.1 – Dichagyris broui
10701.2 – Dichagyris reliqua
10702 – Euxoa divergens, divergent dart moth
10703 – Euxoa sinelinea
10704 – Euxoa edictalis
10705 – Euxoa messoria, reaper dart moth
10706 – Euxoa dissona
10706.1 – Euxoa hyperborea
10707 – Euxoa westermanni
10708 – Euxoa extranea
10709 – Euxoa vallus
10711 – Euxoa churchillensis
10711.1 – Euxoa muldersi
10712 – Euxoa macleani
10712.1 – Euxoa apopsis
10713 – Euxoa chimoensis
10714 – Euxoa quebecensis
10715 – Euxoa scandens, white cutworm moth
10716 – Euxoa aurulenta
10717 – Euxoa trifasciata
10718 – Euxoa lewisi
10720 – Euxoa altens
10721 – Euxoa austrina
10722 – Euxoa cryptica
10722.1 – Euxoa leuschneri
10723 – Euxoa tristicula
10724 – Euxoa vetusta
10725 – Euxoa fuscigerus
10726 – Euxoa atomaris
10727 – Euxoa pleuritica, fawn brown dart moth
10728 – Euxoa pestula
10729 – Euxoa simona
10729.1 – Euxoa hardwicki
10730 – Euxoa adumbrata, sordid dart moth
10731 – Euxoa auxiliaris, army cutworm moth
10732 – Euxoa inconcinna
10733 – Euxoa terrealis
10735 – Euxoa shasta
10736 – Euxoa biformata
10737 – Euxoa intermontana
10738 – Euxoa mimallonis, sordid dart moth
10739 – Euxoa septentrionalis
10740 – Euxoa vernalis
10741 – Euxoa olivia
10742 – Euxoa terrenus
10743 – Euxoa antica
10743.1 – Euxoa franclemonti
10743.2 – Euxoa absona
10744 – Euxoa serricornis
10745 – Euxoa tocoyae
10746 – Euxoa scotogrammoides
10747 – Euxoa annulipes
10747.1 – Euxoa emma
10748 – Euxoa oncocnemoides
10749 – Euxoa intrita
10750 – Euxoa rufula
10751 – Euxoa silens, silent dart moth
10752 – Euxoa pimensis
10753 – Euxoa immixta, mixed dart moth
10754 – Euxoa simulata
10754.1 – Euxoa lafontainei
10755 – Euxoa declarata, clear dart moth
10756 – Euxoa campestris
10757 – Euxoa rockburnei
10758 – Euxoa flavidens
10759 – Euxoa punctigera
10760 – Euxoa aurantiaca
10761 – Euxoa stygialis
10762 – Euxoa cana
10763 – Euxoa spumata
10764 – Euxoa stigmatalis
10765 – Euxoa pallipennis
10765.1 – Euxoa baja
10766 – Euxoa misturata
10767 – Euxoa melana
10768 – Euxoa atristrigata
10769 – Euxoa nevada
10770 – Euxoa cinereopallidus
10771 – Euxoa serotina
10772 – Euxoa camalpa
10773 – Euxoa maderensis
10774 – Euxoa mitis
10775 – Euxoa luctuosa
10776 – Euxoa aequalis
10778 – Euxoa conjuncta
10779 – Euxoa cona
10780 – Euxoa comosa
10781 – Euxoa fumalis
10781.1 – Euxoa occidentalis
10782 – Euxoa lucida
10784 – Euxoa lineifrons
10784.1 – Euxoa guadalupensis
10785 – Euxoa infausta
10786 – Euxoa satis
10786.1 – Euxoa faulkneri
10787 – Euxoa brunneigera
10787.1 – Euxoa excogita
10788 – Euxoa bicollaris
10789 – Euxoa inyoca
10790 – Euxoa selenis
10791 – Euxoa piniae
10792 – Euxoa satiens
10793 – Euxoa scholastica, scholastic dart moth
10794 – Euxoa setonia
10794.1 – Euxoa pallidimacula
10794.2 – Euxoa mojave
10795 – Euxoa pluralis
10796 – Euxoa bifasciata
10797 – Euxoa cinnabarina
10798 – Euxoa basalis
10799 – Euxoa permixta
10800 – Euxoa nostra
10801 – Euxoa ochrogaster
10802 – Euxoa cursoria
10803 – Euxoa velleripennis, fleece-winged dart moth
10804 – Euxoa plagigera
10805 – Euxoa tessellata, tessellate dart moth
10806 – Euxoa henrietta
10807 – Euxoa albipennis
10808 – Euxoa lillooet
10809 – Euxoa catenula
10810 – Euxoa violaris, violet dart moth
10811 – Euxoa siccata
10812 – Euxoa bostoniensis, Boston dart moth
10813 – Euxoa medialis, median-banded dart moth
10814 – Euxoa ustulata
10815 – Euxoa sculptilis
10816 – Euxoa perexcellens
10817 – Euxoa obeliscoides, obelisk dart moth
10818 – Euxoa oberfoelli
10819 – Euxoa choris
10820 – Euxoa hollemani
10820.1 – Euxoa subandera
10821 – Euxoa xasta
10823 – Euxoa cincta
10823.1 – Euxoa coconino
10824 – Euxoa brevipennis
10825 – Euxoa costata
10825.1 – Euxoa castanea
10826 – Euxoa idahoensis
10826.1 – Euxoa furtivus
10827 – Euxoa clausa
10828 – Euxoa foeminalis
10829 – Euxoa laetificans
10830 – Euxoa quadridentata
10830.1 – Euxoa inscripta
10831 – Euxoa niveilinea
10832 – Euxoa agema
10833 – Euxoa olivalis
10834 – Euxoa oblongistigma
10835 – Euxoa melura
10836 – Euxoa dargo
10837 – Euxoa unica
10838 – Euxoa detersa, rubbed dart moth
10839 – Euxoa cicatricosa
10840 – Euxoa recula
10841 – Euxoa citricolor
10842 – Euxoa tronellus
10843 – Euxoa teleboa
10845 – Euxoa difformis
10846 – Euxoa murdocki
10847 – Euxoa moerens
10848 – Euxoa latro
10849 – Euxoa dodi
10850 – Euxoa infracta
10851 – Euxoa redimicula, fillet dart moth
10852 – Euxoa auripennis
10854 – Euxoa servitus, slave dart moth
10855 – Euxoa munis
10856 – Euxoa montana
10857 – Euxoa taura
10859 – Euxoa macrodentata
10860 – Euxoa perolivalis
10861 – Euxoa ridingsiana
10862 – Euxoa aberrans
10863 – Euxoa manitobana
10864 – Euxoa flavicollis
10864.1 – Euxoa maimes
10865 – Euxoa perpolita, polished dart moth
10866 – Euxoa nomas
10867 – Euxoa wilsoni
10868 – Euxoa riversii
10869 – Dichagyris grotei
10870 – Dichagyris acclivis
10870.1 – Dichagyris cataclivis
10871 – Dichagyris proclivis
10872 – Dichagyris neoclivis
10873 – Dichagyris salina
10873.1 – Dichagyris arabella
10874 – Dichagyris socorro
10875 – Dichagyris polycala
10876 – Dichagyris capota
10876.1 – Dichagyris mizteca
10877 – Dichagyris timbor
10878 – Striacosta albicosta, western bean cutworm moth
10879 – Richia serano
10879.1 – Richia herculeana
10880 – Dichagyris kyune
10881 – Richia chortalis
10882 – Richia parentalis
10884 – Dichagyris lobato
10885 – Dichagyris madida
10886 – Dichagyris larga
10887 – Dichagyris cyminopristes
10888 – Dichagyris pyrsogramma
10889 – Dichagyris variabilis
10890 – Dichagyris grandipennis
10891 – Ochropleura implecta, flame-shouldered dart moth
10892 – Protogygia lagena
10892.1 – Protogygia postera
10892.2 – Protogygia rufescens
10893 – Protogygia enalaga
10894 – Protogygia querula
10895 – Protogygia comstocki
10896 – Protogygia polingi
10896.1 – Protogygia pectinata
10896.2 – Protogygia whitesandsensis
10898 – Protogygia milleri
10899 – Protogygia biclavis
10900 – Protogygia elevata
10900.1 – Protogygia arena
10900.2 – Protogygia alberta
10901 – Anicla lubricans, slippery dart moth
10901.1 – Anicla sullivani
10902 – Anicla forbesi
10903 – Anicla illapsa, snowy dart moth
10904 – Anicla beata
10904.1 – Anicla mus
10905 – Anicla exuberans
10907 – Anicla simplicius
10908 – Anicla digna
10908.1 – Anicla biformata
10909 – Anicla tenuescens
10910 – Anicla tepperi
10910.1 – Anicla espoetia
10911 – Anicla infecta, green cutworm moth
10912 – Anicla cemolia
10913 – Euxoa bochus
10914 – Hemieuxoa rudens
10915 – Peridroma saucia, variegated cutworm moth
10916 – Diarsia calgary
10917 – Diarsia rubifera, red dart moth
10918 – Diarsia dislocata
10919 – Diarsia jucunda, smaller pinkish dart moth
10920 – Diarsia esurialis
10921 – Diarsia rosaria
10923 – Actebia balanitis
10924 – Actebia fennica, Finland dart moth
10925 – Rhyacia quadrangula
10925.1 – Rhyacia clemens
10926 – Spaelotis clandestina, clandestine dart moth
10926.1 – Spaelotis bicava
10926.2 – Spaelotis unicava
10927 – Spaelotis havilae
10927.1 – Spaelotis velicava
10927.2 – Spaelotis quadricava
10928 – Graphiphora augur, double dart moth
10929 – Eurois occulta, great brocade moth
10930 – Eurois astricta
10931 – Eurois nigra
10933 – Richia praefixa
10934 – Xestia liquidaria
10935 – Parabarrovia keelei
10935.1 – Parabarrovia omilaki
10935.2 – Parabarrovia ogilviensis
10936 – Xestia tecta
10937 – Xestia wockei
10938 – Xestia scropulana
10939 – Xestia okakensis
10939.1 – Xestia lorezi
10941 – Xestia bolteri
10942 – Xestia c-nigrum, lesser black-letter dart moth
10942.1 – Xestia dolosa, greater black-letter dart moth
10943 – Xestia normanianus, Norman's dart moth
10944 – Xestia smithii, Smith's dart moth
10945 – Xestia xanthographa, square-spot rustic moth
10946 – Xestia conchis
10947 – Xestia oblata, rosy dart moth
10948 – Prognorisma substrigata
10949 – Xestia cinerascens
10950 – Pseudohermonassa bicarnea, pink-spotted dart moth
10951 – Pseudohermonassa tenuicula, Morrison's sooty dart moth
10952 – Pseudohermonassa flavotincta
10953 – Pseudohermonassa ononensis
10954 – Agnorisma bugrai, collared dart moth
10955 – Agnorisma badinodis, pale-banded dart moth
10956 – Agnorisma bollii
10957 – Xestia atrata
10958 – Xestia fabulosa
10959 – Xestia speciosa
10959.1 – Xestia mixta
10962 – Xestia perquiritata
10963 – Xestia lupa
10963.1 – Xestia laxa
10964 – Xestia homogena
10965 – Xestia imperita
10966 – Xestia albuncula
10966.1 – Xestia ursae
10967 – Xestia elimata, southern variable dart moth
10968 – Xestia badicollis, northern variable dart moth
10968.1 – Xestia praevia, praevia dart moth
10969 – Xestia dilucida, dull reddish dart moth
10969.1 – Xestia intermedia
10969.2 – Xestia thula
10971 – Xestia mustelina
10972 – Xestia infimatis
10972.1 – Xestia finatimis
10973 – Xestia vernilis
10973.1 – Xestia verniloides
10975 – Setagrotis pallidicollis
10975.1 – Setagrotis vocalis
10976 – Setagrotis radiola
10977 – Tesagrotis atrifrons
10978 – Tesagrotis piscipellis
10978.1 – Tesagrotis corrodera
10978.2 – Tesagrotis amia
10980 – Xestia staudingeri
10980.1 – Xestia inuitica
10981 – Xestia maculata
10982 – Xestia colorado
10983 – Xestia alaskae
10984 – Xestia aequaeva
10985 – Xestia quieta
10986 – Xestia bryanti
10986.1 – Xestia lyngei
10986.2 – Xestia woodi
10986.3 – Xestia fergusoni
10987.1 – Xestia kolymae
10988 – Coenophila opacifrons, blueberry dart moth
10989 – Adelphagrotis stellaris
10991 – Adelphagrotis indeterminata
10991.1 – Adelphagrotis carissima
10992 – Paradiarsia littoralis
10993 – Hemipachnobia subporphyrea
10993.1 – Hemipachnobia monochromatea
10994 – Cerastis tenebrifera, reddish speckled dart moth
10995 – Cerastis cornuta
10995.1 – Cerastis robertsoni
10995.2 – Cerastis enigmatica, enigmatic dart moth
10995.3 – Cerastis gloriosa
10996 – Cerastis salicarum, willow dart moth
10997 – Cerastis fishii
10998 – Choephora fungorum, bent-line dart moth
10999 – Aplectoides condita
11000 – Anaplectoides prasina, green arches moth
11001 – Anaplectoides pressus, dappled dart moth
11002 – Anaplectoides brunneomedia, brown-lined dart moth
11003 – Chersotis juncta
11003.1 – Noctua pronuba, large yellow underwing moth
11003.2 – Noctua comes, lesser yellow underwing moth
11004 – Protolampra rufipectus
11006 – Protolampra brunneicollis, brown-collared dart moth
11007 – Eueretagrotis sigmoides, sigmoid dart moth
11008 – Eueretagrotis perattentus, two-spot dart moth
11009 – Eueretagrotis attentus, attentive dart moth
11010 – Lycophotia phyllophora, lycophotia moth
11011 – Xestia plebeia
11012 – Cryptocala acadiensis, catocaline dart moth
11013 – Abagrotis erratica
11014 – Abagrotis kirkwoodi
11015 – Abagrotis alcandola
11016 – Abagrotis vittifrons
11017 – Abagrotis bimarginalis
11018 – Abagrotis trigona
11019 – Abagrotis mirabilis
11020 – Abagrotis rubricundis
11021 – Abagrotis striata
11022 – Abagrotis glenni
11023 – Abagrotis hennei
11024 – Abagrotis nefascia
11025 – Abagrotis alampeta
11025.1 – Abagrotis petalama
11026 – Abagrotis denticulata
11027 – Abagrotis orbis
11028 – Abagrotis baueri
11029 – Abagrotis alternata, greater red dart moth
11029.1 – Abagrotis mexicana
11029.2 – Abagrotis forbesi
11030 – Abagrotis turbulenta
11030.1 – Abagrotis hermina
11032 – Abagrotis variata
11033 – Abagrotis scopeops
11035 – Abagrotis discoidalis
11036 – Abagrotis pulchrata
11037 – Abagrotis apposita
11038 – Abagrotis nanalis
11039 – Abagrotis duanca
11040 – Abagrotis reedi
11041 – Abagrotis placida
11042 – Abagrotis dodi
11042.1 – Abagrotis dickeli
11043 – Abagrotis cupida, Cupid dart moth
11043.1 – Abagrotis magnicupida
11044 – Abagrotis brunneipennis
11044.1 – Abagrotis cryptica
11045 – Abagrotis anchocelioides, blueberry budworm moth
11046 – Abagrotis belfragei
11047 – Parabagrotis exsertistigma
11047.1 – Parabagrotis formalis
11047.2 – Parabagrotis insularis
11047.3 – Parabagrotis cupidissima
11048 – Parabagrotis sulinaris
11049 – Pronoctua typica
11050 – Pronoctua pyrophiloides
11050.1 – Pronoctua peabodyae
11050.2 – Pronoctua craboi
11050.3 – Isochlora sericea
11051 – Ufeus satyricus, Grote's satyr moth
11052 – Ufeus plicatus
11052.1 – Ufeus hulstii
11053 – Ufeus faunus
no number yet – Ufeus felsensteini
11055 – Derrima stellata, pink star moth
11056 W – Microhelia angelica
11058 W – Heliothodes diminutiva, small heliothodes moth
11061 – Baptarma felicita
11062 W – Eutricopis nexilis, white-spotted midget moth
11063 – Pyrrhia cilisca, bordered sallow moth
11064 – Pyrrhia exprimens, purple-lined sallow moth
11065 – Pyrrhia aurantiago, orange sallow moth
11066 W – Psectrotarsia suavis
11067 W – Psectrotarsia hebardi
11068 – Helicoverpa zea, corn earworm moth
11070 – Heliothis subflexa, subflexus straw moth
11071 – Heliothis virescens, tobacco budworm moth
11072 – Heliothis phloxiphaga, darker spotted straw moth
11072.1 – Heliothis acesias
11072.2 W – Heliothis australis
11073 – Heliocheilus turbata, spotted straw moth
11073.1 – Heliocheilus lupatus, lupatus straw moth
11074 – Heliocheilus paradoxus, paradoxical grass moth
11075 W – Heliocheilus julia
11076 W – Heliocheilus toralis
11077 W – Heliothis ononis, flax bollworm moth
11078 W – Heliothis oregonica, Oregon gem moth
11079 W – Heliothis proruptus
11080 W – Heliothis belladonna
11081 – Heliothis borealis
11082 – Schinia nuchalis
11083 W – Schinia villosa
11083.1 – Schinia sexata
11083.2 W – Schinia intermontana
11086 W – Schinia graefiana
11087 W – Schinia vacciniae
11088 W – Schinia suetus
11088.1 W – Schinia aetheria
11089 W – Schinia aurantiaca
11090 W – Schinia amaryllis
11091 W – Schinia perminuta, western small flower moth
11092 W – Schinia roseitincta
11093 W – Schinia antonio
11094 W – Schinia carminatra
11095 – Schinia indiana, phlox moth
11096 W – Schinia scarletina
11097 W – Schinia pulchripennis
11098 – Schinia scissa
11099 – Schinia scissoides, divided flower moth
11100 W – Schinia avemensis
11101 W – Schinia dobla
11102 W – Schinia honesta
11102.1 W – Schinia verna
11103 W – Schinia persimilis
11103.1 W – Schinia macneilli
11104 – Schinia spinosae, spinose flower moth
11104.1 – Schinia subspinosae
11105 – Schinia bina, bina flower moth
11106 W – Schinia volupia, painted schinia moth
11107 – Schinia fulleri
11107.1 – Schinia sanrafaeli
11108 – Schinia masoni, gaillardia flower moth
11110 – Schinia septentrionalis, northern flower moth
11112 W – Schinia sordidus, sordid flower moth
11113 – Schinia petulans
11115 W – Schinia siren, alluring schinia moth
11115.1 W – Schinia varix
11116 – Schinia tuberculum, golden aster flower moth
11116.1 – Schinia rufipenna
11117 – Schinia lynx, lynx flower moth
11118 – Schinia obscurata, erigeron flower moth
11120 – Schinia parmeliana
11122 W – Schinia bicuspida
11124 W – Schinia errans
11125 W – Schinia biforma
11127 W – Schinia ultima
11128 – Schinia arcigera, arcigera flower moth
11130 – Schinia olivacea
11131 – Schinia mortua
11132 – Schinia jaguarina, jaguar flower moth
11132.1 – Schinia hardwickorum
11133 – Schinia edwardsii
11133.1 W – Schinia angulilinea
11134 W – Schinia cupes
11134.1 W – Schinia crotchii
11134.2 W – Schinia deserticola
11134.3 W – Schinia mexicana
11134.4 W – Schinia carrizoensis, carrizo flower moth
11135 – Schinia rivulosa, ragweed flower moth
11136 – Schinia hanga
11137 – Schinia nubila, camphorweed flower moth
11140 – Schinia saturata, brown flower moth
11140.1 – Schinia psamathea
11141 – Schinia thoreaui, Thoreau's flower moth
11146 W – Schinia buta
11147 – Schinia gracilenta, slender flower moth
11148 – Schinia oleagina
11148.1 – Schinia grandimedia
11149 – Schinia trifascia, three-lined flower moth
11150 W – Schinia accessa
11150.1 W – Schinia acutilinea
11151 W – Schinia sexplagiata
11152 W – Schinia tobia
11153 W – Schinia velaris
11155 W – Schinia miniana, desert marigold moth
11157 W – Schinia biundulata
11157.1 W – Schinia immaculata
11159 W – Schinia intrabilis
11160 W – Schinia ligeae
11161 E – Schinia jaegeri
11162 W – Schinia simplex
11163 W – Schinia felicitata
11163.1 – Schinia lynda
11164 – Schinia florida, primrose moth
11166 W – Schinia regia
11166.1 – Schinia regina, reginia primrose moth
11167 W – Schinia niveicosta
11168 – Schinia gaurae, clouded crimson moth
11169 – Schinia mitis
11170 – Schinia illustra
11173 – Schinia sanguinea, bleeding flower moth
11173.1 – Schinia carmosina
11174 – Schinia lucens, leadplant flower moth
11175 W – Schinia meadi, Mead's flower moth
11176 W – Schinia zuni
11177 – Schinia nundina, goldenrod flower moth
11178 – Schinia arefacta, arefacta flower moth
11179 W – Schinia tertia
11180 W – Schinia argentifascia
11181 W – Schinia albafascia
11181.1 W – Schinia ferrisi
11182 – Schinia brunnea
11182.1 W – Schinia erosa
11183 W – Schinia diffusa
11184 W – Schinia walsinghami
11185 W – Schinia crenilinea, creniline flower moth
11187 W – Schinia coercita
11188 W – Schinia unimacula, rabbitbush flower moth
11188.1 – Schinia maculata
11192 W – Schinia cumatilis
11193 – Schinia hulstia, Hulst's flower moth
11195 W – Schinia reniformis
11196 W – Schinia obliqua
11197 W – Schinia oculata
11198 – Schinia alencis
11199 – Schinia chrysellus, chrysellus flower moth
11199.1 – Schinia chryselloides
11200 W – Schinia ciliata
11200.1 – Schinia rufocostulata
11201 – Schinia bimatris
11202 – Schinia carolinensis
11203 W – Schinia luxa
11204 W – Schinia citrinellus
11204.2 – Schinia mcfarlandi
11206 W – Schinia snowi
11207 W – Heliolonche modicella
11208 W – Heliolonche carolus
11209 W – Heliolonche celeris
11210 W – Heliolonche pictipennis
11210.1 – Heliolonche joaquinensis
11212 W – Melaporphyria immortua
11213 – Grotella septempunctata
11214 – Grotella harveyi
11215 – Grotella sampita
11216 – Grotella blanca
11217 – Grotella dis
11218 – Grotella parvipuncta
11219 – Grotella stretchi
11220 – Grotella vagans
11221 – Grotella binda
11222 – Grotella tricolor
11223 – Grotella soror
11224 – Grotella margueritaria
11225 – Grotella grisescens
11226 – Grotella olivacea
11227 – Grotella citronella
11228 – Grotella vauriae
11229 – Grotella blanchardi
11230 – Hemigrotella argenteostriata
11231 – Neogrotella confusa
11232 – Neogrotella spaldingi
11233 – Neogrotella macdunnoughi

See also
List of butterflies of North America
List of Lepidoptera of Hawaii
List of moths of Canada
List of butterflies of Canada

External links
Checklists of North American Moths

Moths of North America
North America